= List of mountains in Sweden =

Sweden has 12 peaks above 2,000 metres (6,560 ft) in height.

| Rank | Mountain | Province | Elevation | | Notes |
| Rank | Mountain | Province | m | ft | Notes |
|---|---|---|---|---|---|
| 1. | Kebnekaise, Nordtoppen | Lappland | 2,096.8 | 6,879 | |
| 2. | Kebnekaise, Sydtoppen | Lappland | 2,093 | 6,867 | since 1st of August 2018 due to the shrinkage of the glacier. |
| 3. | Sarektjåkkå, Stortoppen | Lappland | 2,089 | 6,854 | |
| 4. | Kaskasatjåkka | Lappland | 2,071 | 6,795 | |
| 5. | Sarektjåkkå, Nordtoppen | Lappland | 2,054 | 6,739 | |
| 6. | Kaskasapakte | Lappland | 2,040 | 6,690 | |
| 7. | Sarektjåkkå, Buchttoppen | Lappland | 2,030 | 6,660 | |
| 8. | Sarektjåkkå, Sydtoppen | Lappland | 2,025 | 6,644 | |
| 9. | Palkattjåkkå | Lappland | 2,016 | 6,614 | |
| 10 | Áhkká, Stortoppen | Lappland | 2,011 | 6,598 | |
| 11 | Pårtetjåkkå | Lappland | 2,007 | 6,585 | |
| 12 | Akka, Nordvästtoppen | Lappland | 2,007 | 6,585 | |
| 13 | Sielmatjåkkå | Lappland | 2,004 | 6,575 | |

Sweden, Highest elevation per historical province:

| Province | Mountain | Elevation (m) | Elevation (ft) |
|---|---|---|---|
| Blekinge | Rävabacken | 189 | 620 |
| Bohuslän | Björnerödspiggen | 222 | 728 |
| Dalarna | Storvätteshågna | 1,204 | 3,950 |
| Dalsland | Baljåsen | 302 | 991 |
| Gotland | Lojsta hed | 83 | 272 |
| Gästrikland | Lustigknopp | 402 | 1,319 |
| Halland | Högalteknall | 226 | 741 |
| Hälsingland | Garpkölen | 671 | 2,201 |
| Härjedalen | Helags | 1,797 | 5,896 |
| Jämtland | Storsylen | 1,743 | 5,719 |
| Lappland | Kebnekaise | 2,097 | 6,880 |
| Medelpad | Myckelmyrberget | 577 | 1,893 |
| Norrbotten | Råpi | 926 | 3,038 |
| Närke | Tomasbodahöjden | 298 | 978 |
| Skåne | Söderåsen | 212 | 696 |
| Småland | Tomtabacken | 377 | 1,237 |
| Södermanland | Skogsbyås | 124 | 407 |
| Uppland | Tallmossen | 118 | 387 |
| Värmland | Granberget | 701 | 2,300 |
| Västerbotten | Åmliden | 550 | 1,800 |
| Västergötland | Galtåsen | 361 | 1,184 |
| Västmanland | Fjällberget | 466 | 1,529 |
| Ångermanland | Tåsjöberget | 635 | 2,083 |
| Öland | Högsrum | 55 | 180 |
| Östergötland | Stenabohöjden | 328 | 1,076 |
