= List of mountains in Finland =

No.	Mountain	Region	Elevation
1.	Halti	Lapland/Troms (Norway)	1328 m
2.	Ridnitšohkka	Lapland	1317 m
3.	Kiedditsohkka	Lapland	1280 m
4.	Kovddoskaisi	Lapland	1240 m
5.	Ruvdnaoaivi	Lapland	1239 m
6.	Loassonibba	Lapland	1180 m
7.	Urtasvaara	Lapland	1150 m
8.	Kahperusvaarat	Lapland	1144 m
9.	Aldorassa	Lapland	1130 m
10.	Kieddoaivi	Lapland	1100 m

- The summit of Halti at 1,365 m is in Norway, which makes Ridnitsohkka the highest summit in Finland.
