= Henvålen Nature Reserve =

Nature reserve in Jämtland County, Sweden

- IUCN category Ib (wilderness area)
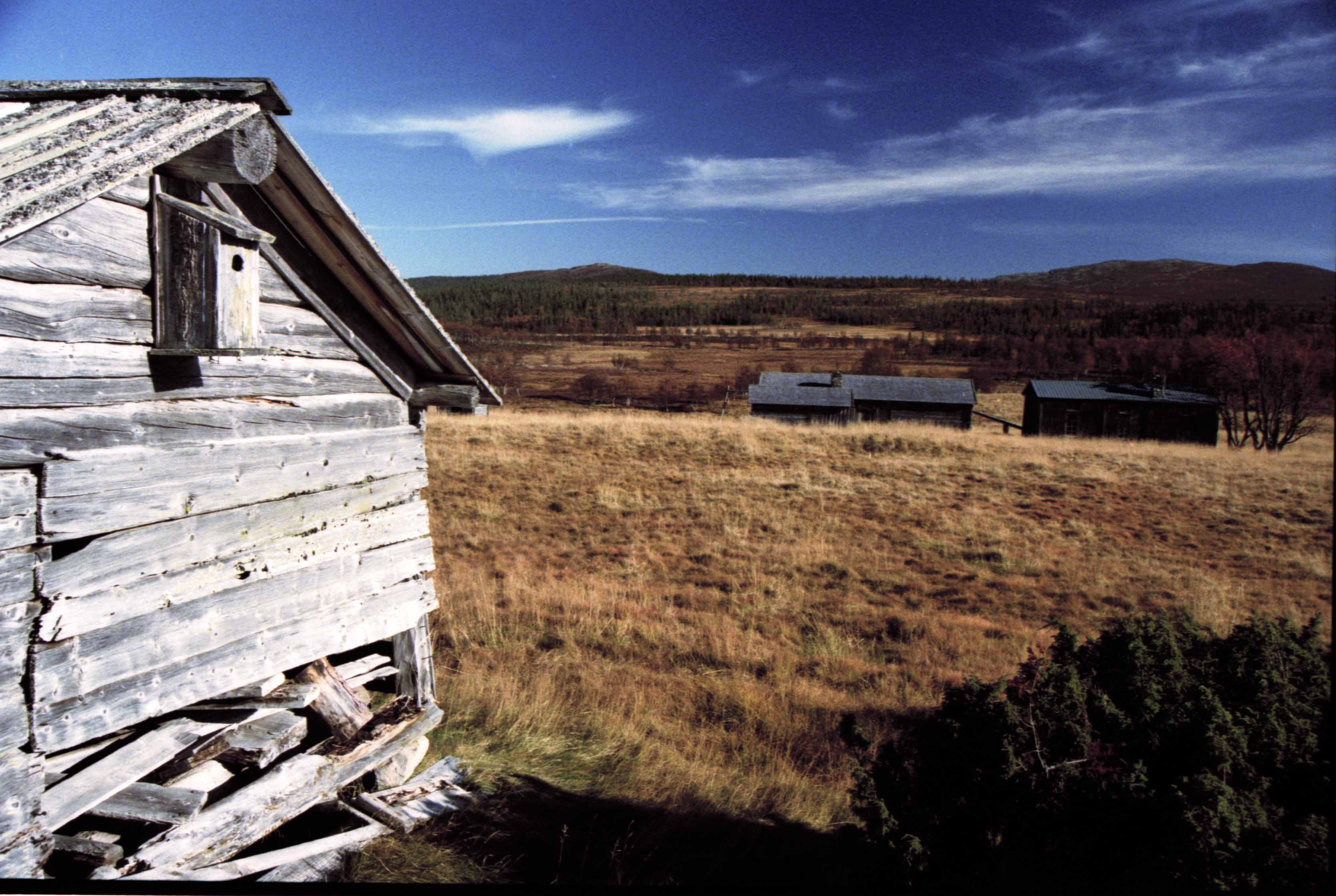

- Location within Jämtland Location within Sweden
- Location: Sweden
- Nearest city: Östersund
- Coordinates: 62°41′N 13°17′E
- Area: 180 km^{2} (44,000 acres)
- Established: 1998

Ramsar Wetland
- Official name: Aloppkölen-Köpmankölen
- Designated: 19 November 2001
- Reference no.: 1113

Henvålen Nature Reserve (Swedish: Henvålens naturreservat) is a nature reserve in Jämtland County in Sweden. It is part of the EU-wide Natura 2000-network and parts of the wetland areas are designated Ramsar sites.

The nature reserve occupies a plateau at the edge of the Scandinavian Mountains and includes, apart from mountainous areas also wetlands and old-growth forest. The highest part of the nature reserve is the mountain peak Särvfjället, reaching 1,170 m (3,840 ft).
