= OJE =

OJE or oje can refer to

- Öje, a village in Malung municipality, Dalarna, Sweden
- Ojé, an antihelminthic folk remedy made from Ficus insipida latex
- Organización Juvenil Española, Spanish Youth Organization, volunteer movement that originated in 1960
