= Forsen (disambiguation) =

Forsen is a Swedish video game player and live streamer.

Forsen may also refer to:

- Forsen (surname)

== See also ==
- Forsån (Swedish: "little rapids") a stream in southern Stockholm, Sweden also known as Stortorpsån and Forsen
- Storforsen (Swedish "the great rapids") in Sweden
- Styggforsen, Stygg Rapids, a waterfall and a nature reserve in Dalarna County
- Limedsforsen, a locality situated in Malung-Sälen Municipality, Dalarna County, Sweden
