= Ärnäs, Malung-Sälen Municipality =

Coordinates: 60°53′59″N 13°22′00″E

Ärnäs (also, Arnäs) is a village adjacent to Limedsforsen, Malung-Sälen Municipality, Dalarna County, Sweden.
