= Forsen (surname) =

Forsén, a Swedish family name, in America Forsen. Notable people with the name include:

- Harold K. Forsen (1932–2012), American physicist
- John Forsen (born 1958), American film producer and director
- Lena Forsén (born 1951), Swedish Playboy Playmate model and subject in the standard test image Lenna

== See also ==
- Forsen (disambiguation)
