= Transtrand =

Transtrand, Malung-sälen
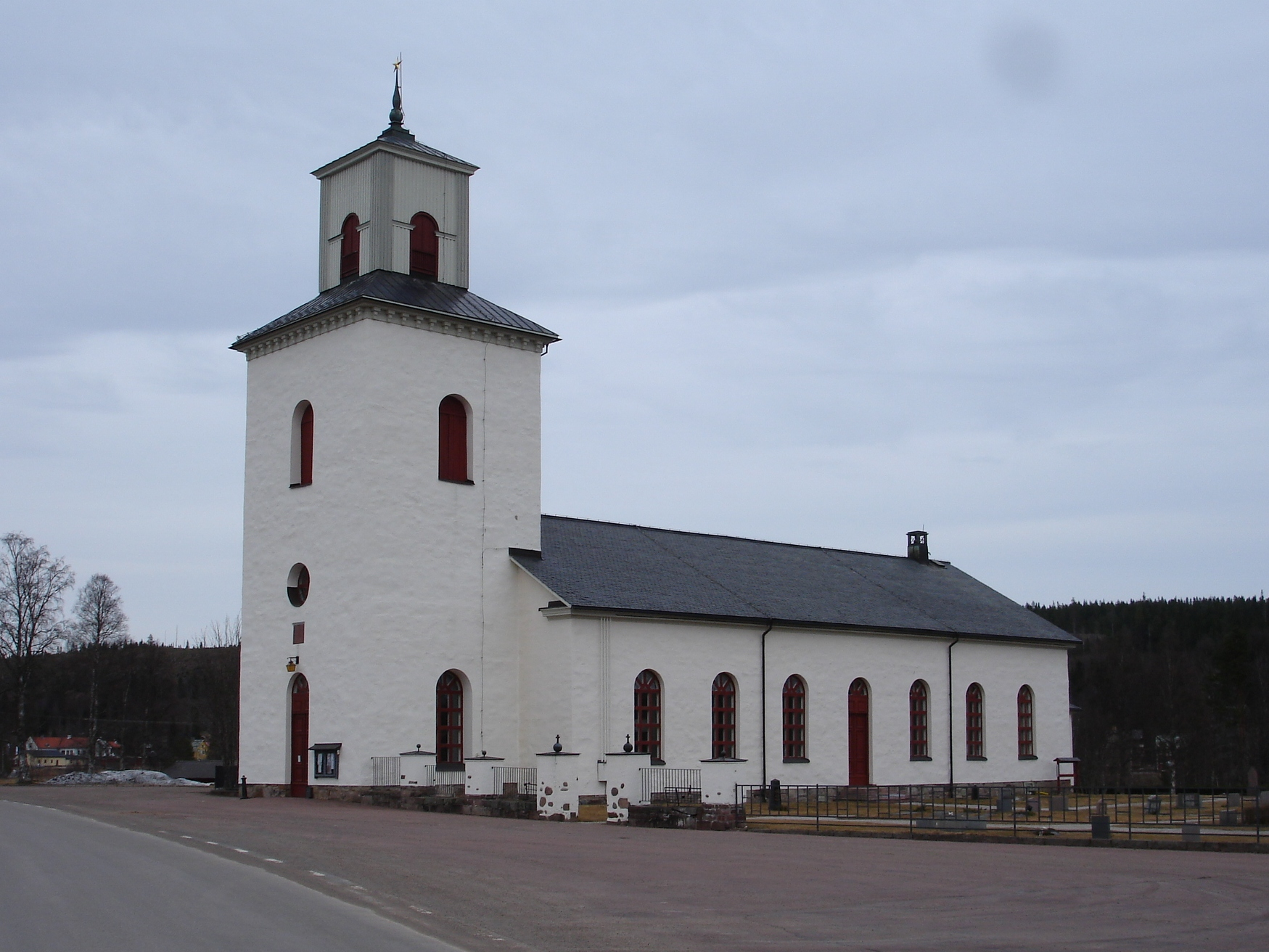
- Transtrand Church

- Location within Dalarna Location within Sweden
- Coordinates: 61°05′28″N 13°19′10″E
- Country: Sweden
- Province: Dalarna
- County: Dalarna County
- Municipality: Malung-Sälen Municipality

Area
  - Total: 2.15 km^{2} (0.83 sq mi)

Population (31 December 2010)
  - Total: 386
  - Density: 179/km^{2} (460/sq mi)
- Time zone: UTC+1 (CET)
  - Summer (DST): UTC+2 (CEST)

Transtrand is a locality situated in Malung-Sälen Municipality, Dalarna County, Sweden with 386 inhabitants in 2010.
