= Lima, Sweden =

Lima
- Location within Dalarna Location within Sweden
- Coordinates: 60°56′13″N 13°21′37″E
- Country: Sweden
- Province: Dalarna
- County: Dalarna County
- Municipality: Malung-Sälen Municipality

Area
  - Total: 2.16 km^{2} (0.83 sq mi)

Population (31 December 2010)
  - Total: 398
  - Density: 184/km^{2} (480/sq mi)
- Time zone: UTC+1 (CET)
  - Summer (DST): UTC+2 (CEST)

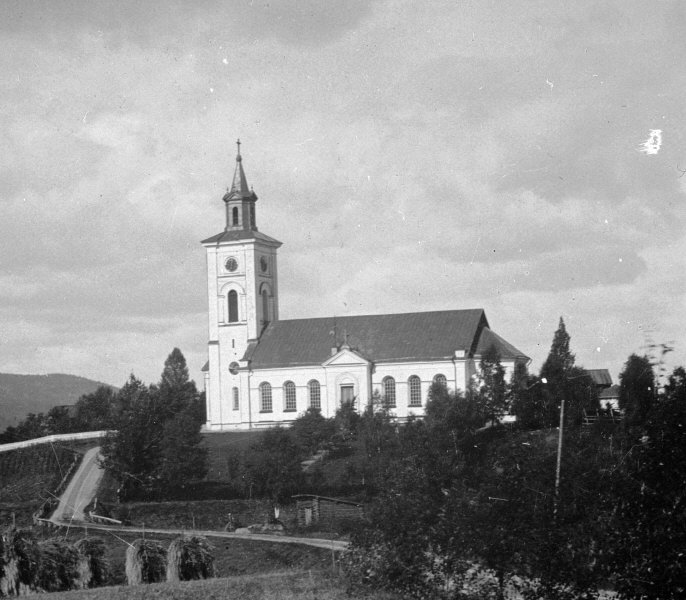
Church in Lima

Lima is a locality situated in Malung-Sälen Municipality, Dalarna County, Sweden with 398 inhabitants in 2010.
