= Malungsfors =

- Location within Dalarna Location within Sweden
- Coordinates: 60°44′N 13°33′E
- Country: Sweden
- Province: Dalarna
- County: Dalarna County
- Municipality: Malung-Sälen Municipality

Area
  - Total: 2.58 km^{2} (1.00 sq mi)

Population (31 December 2010)
  - Total: 560
  - Density: 217/km^{2} (560/sq mi)
- Time zone: UTC+1 (CET)
  - Summer (DST): UTC+2 (CEST)

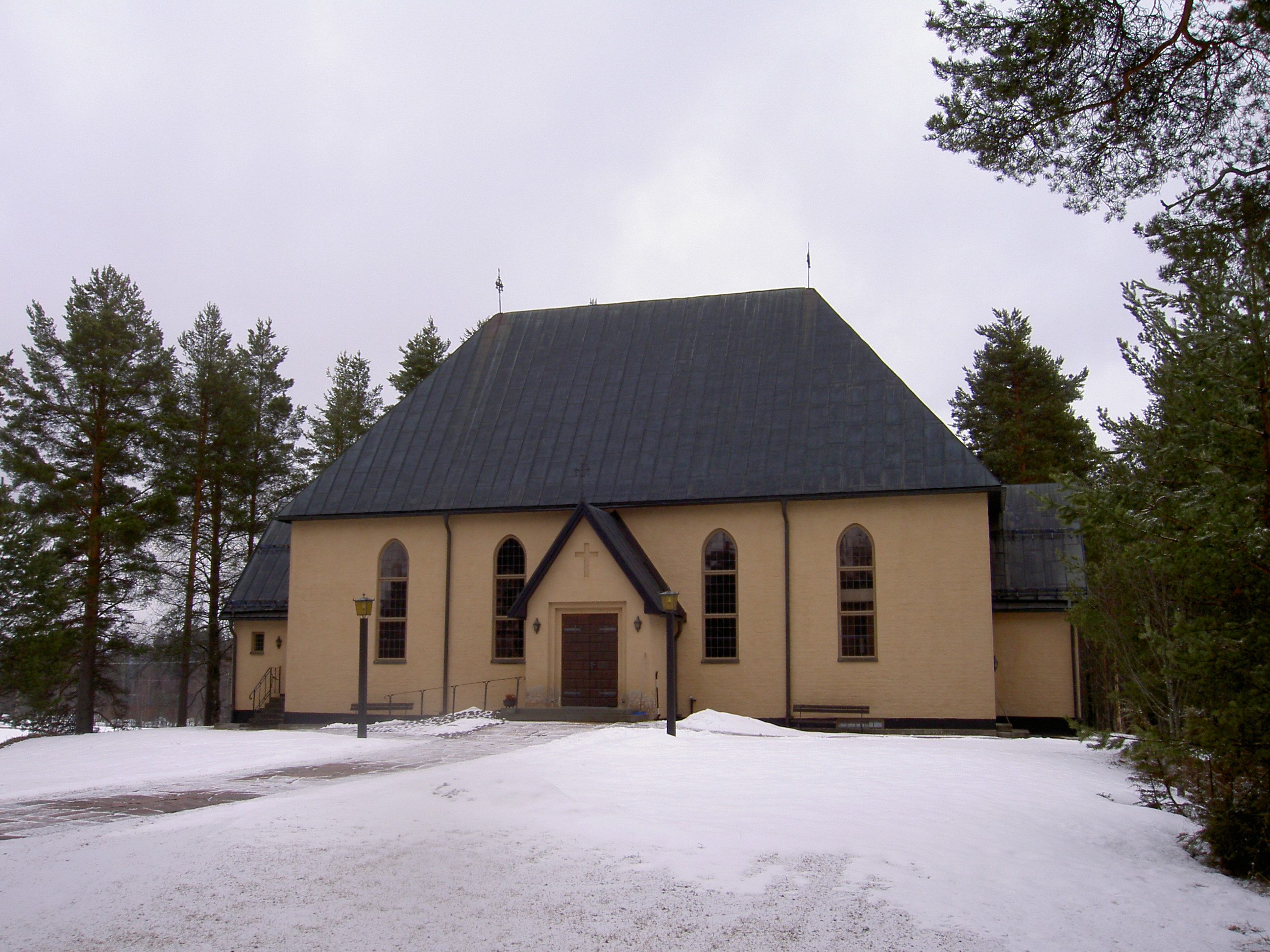
Fors Chapel, Malungsfors, Sweden

Malungsfors is a locality situated in Malung-Sälen Municipality, Dalarna County, Sweden. In 2010, it had 560 inhabitants, whereas according to Statistics Sweden, in 2023 it had a population of 510.
