= Áhkká =

Massif in Sweden

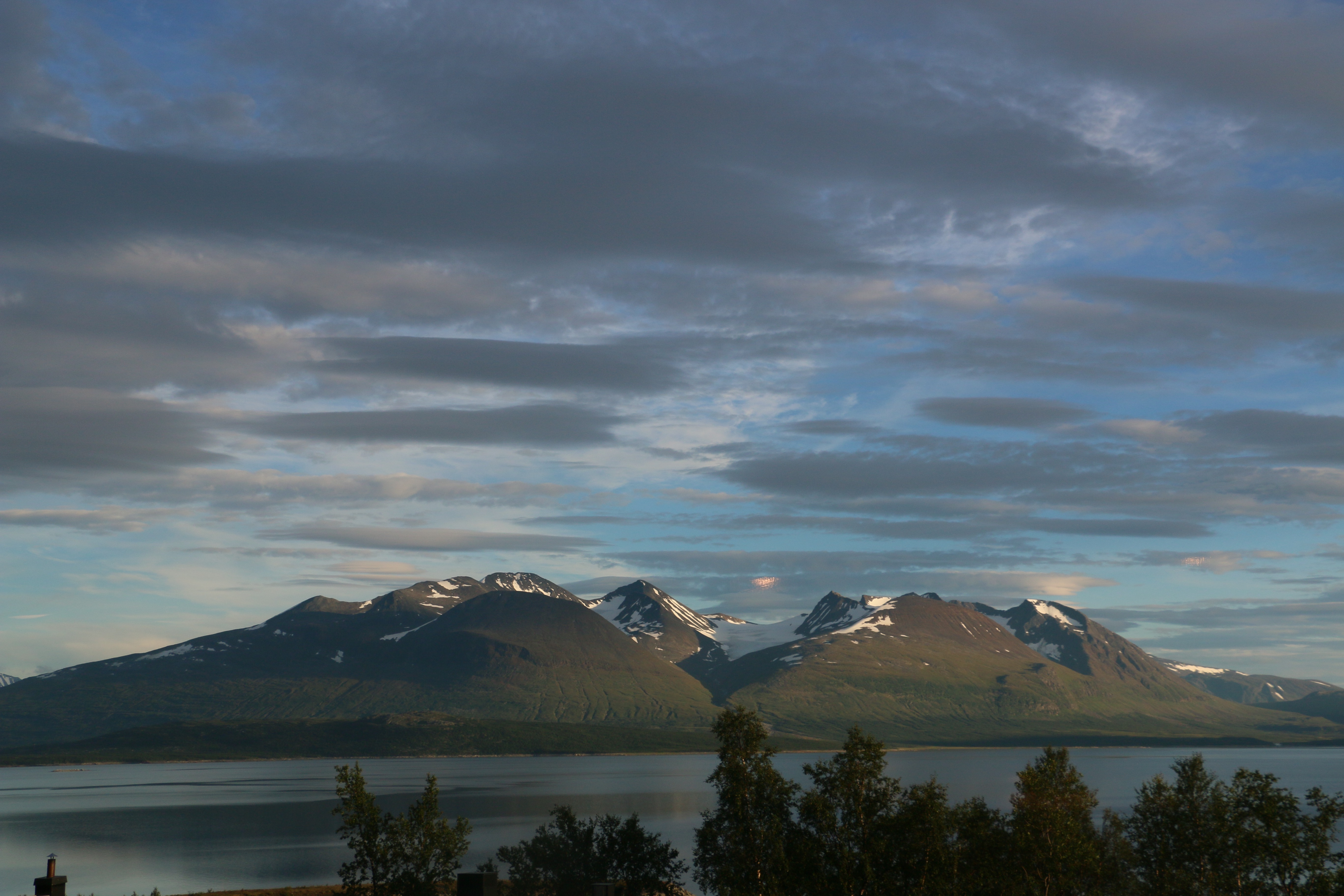
- Áhkká seen from Ritsem

Highest point
- Elevation: 2,011 m (6,598 ft)
- Prominence: 1,105 m (3,625 ft)
- Isolation: 19.27 km (11.97 mi) to Sarektjåkkå
- Coordinates: 67°35′N 17°29′E

Naming
- English translation: Wife
- Language of name: Lule Sami

Geography
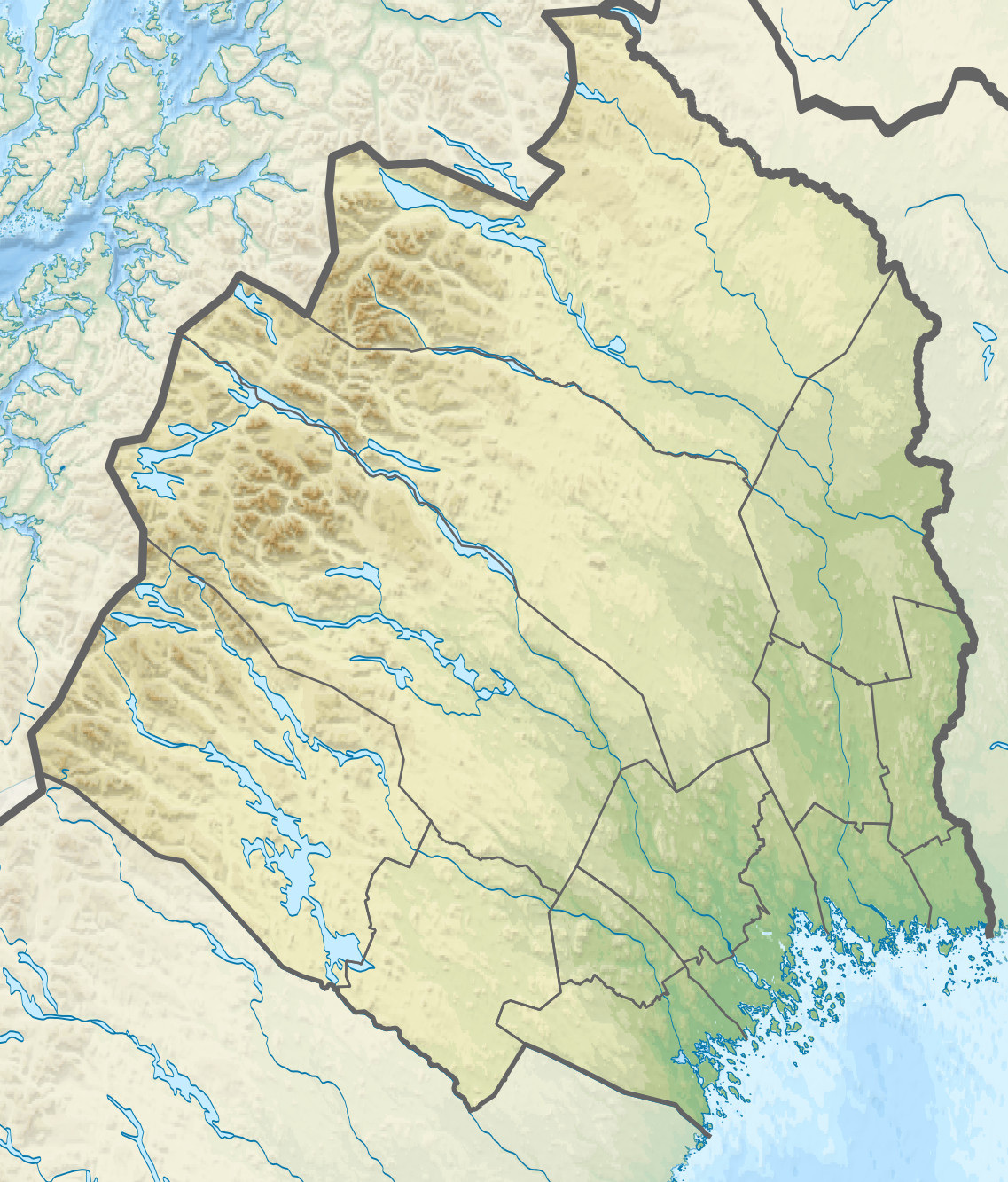
- Location within Norrbotten
- Location: Norrbotten County, Sweden
- Parent range: Scandinavian Mountains

Áhkká (Lule Sami for 'wife', pronounced [ˈɑːhːkɑː]), is a massif in the southwestern corner of Stora Sjöfallet National Park in northern Sweden.

The massif has twelve individual peaks and ten glaciers, of which Stortoppen is the highest at 2,011 metres (6,598 feet). This peak is the tenth-highest in Sweden. Most notable is that the mountain has a vertical drop of 1,563 m (5,128 ft), from the top of the highest summit down to the lake Akkajaure in the valley below, which is located at 453 m (1,486 ft). This is the highest vertical drop found in Sweden. Since the lake below the mountain is regulated by a hydroelectric power station, its surface can drop down to 423 m (1,388 ft), which makes the mountain's vertical drop rise to a maximum of 1,593 m (5,226 ft). Due to the large level differences and the massif being well held together and rather isolated, it looks impressive, earning it the nickname Queen of Lapland. In the Sámi tradition it is a holy mountain, and some hikers regard it with a sense of awe and mystique.

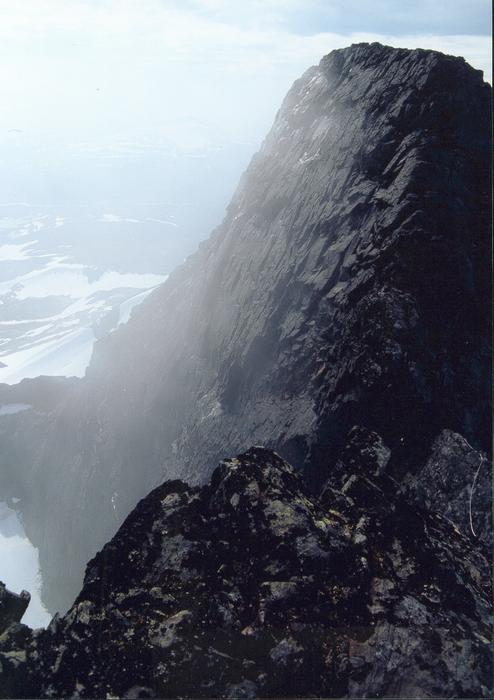
Summit of Áhkká from the north-eastern peak

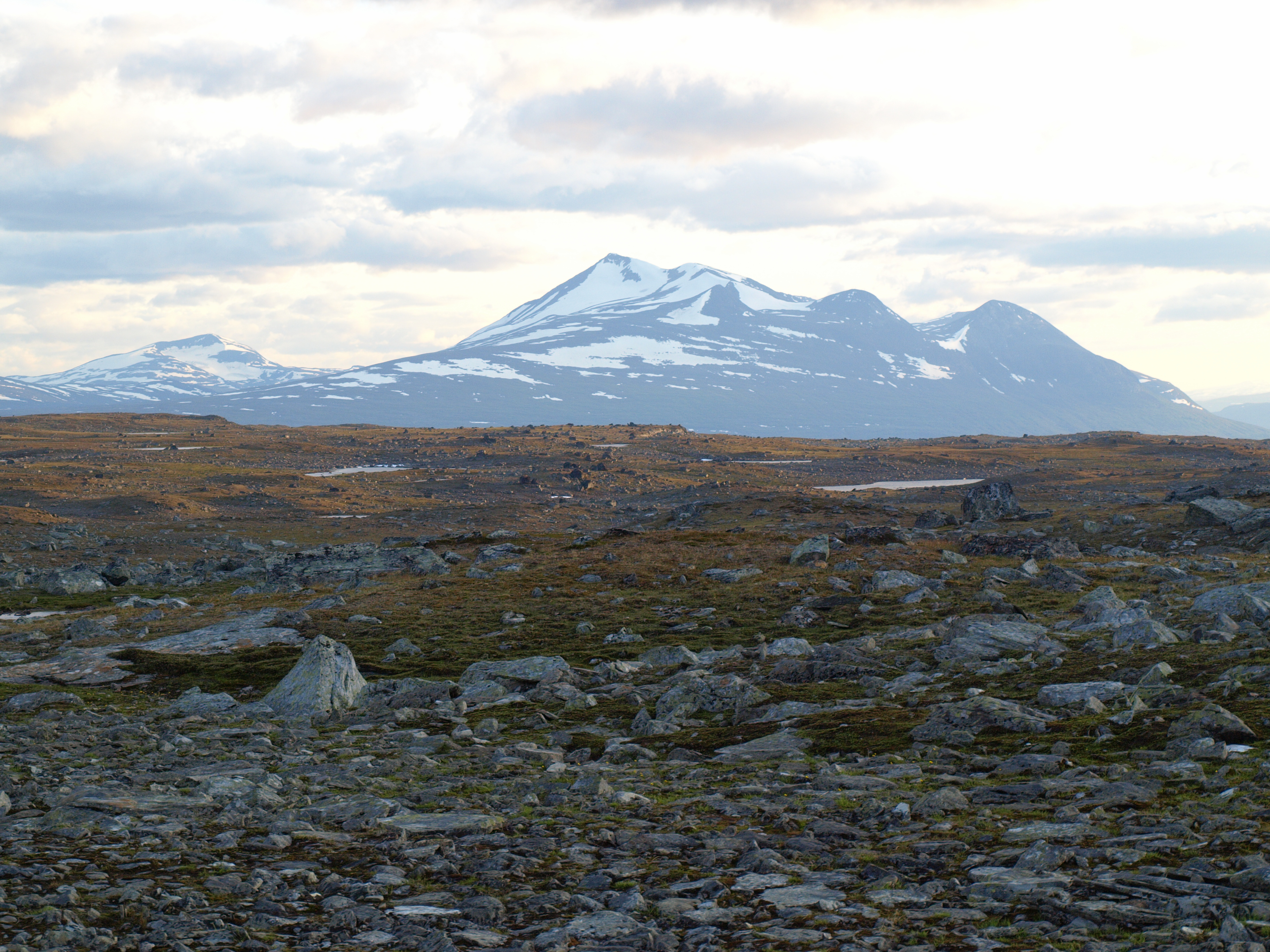
Áhkká massif in July 2009 seen from the north-east.

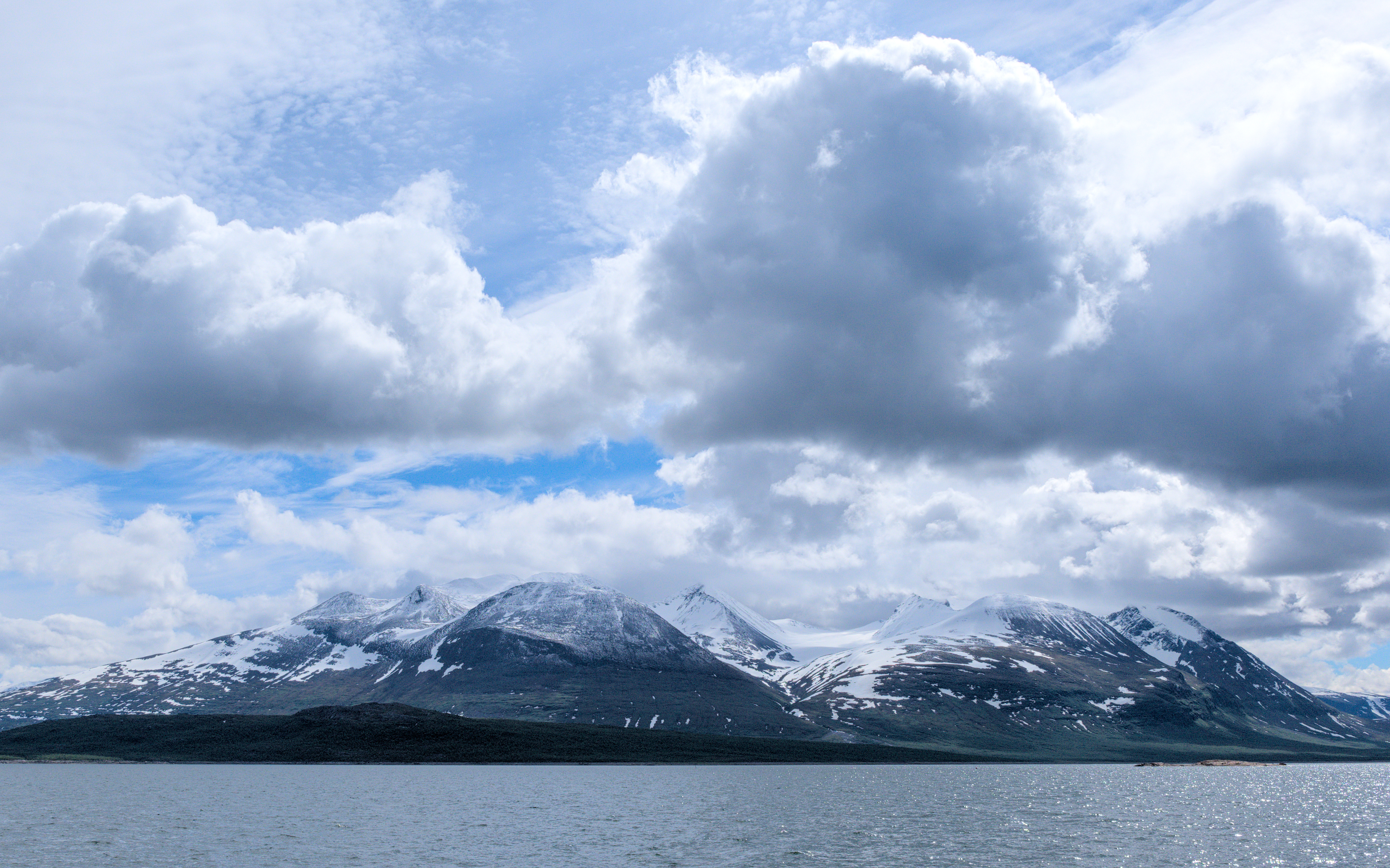
Áhkká massif from the Akkajaure
