= Malung-Sälen Municipality =

Malung-Sälen Municipality Malung-Sälens kommun
- Municipality
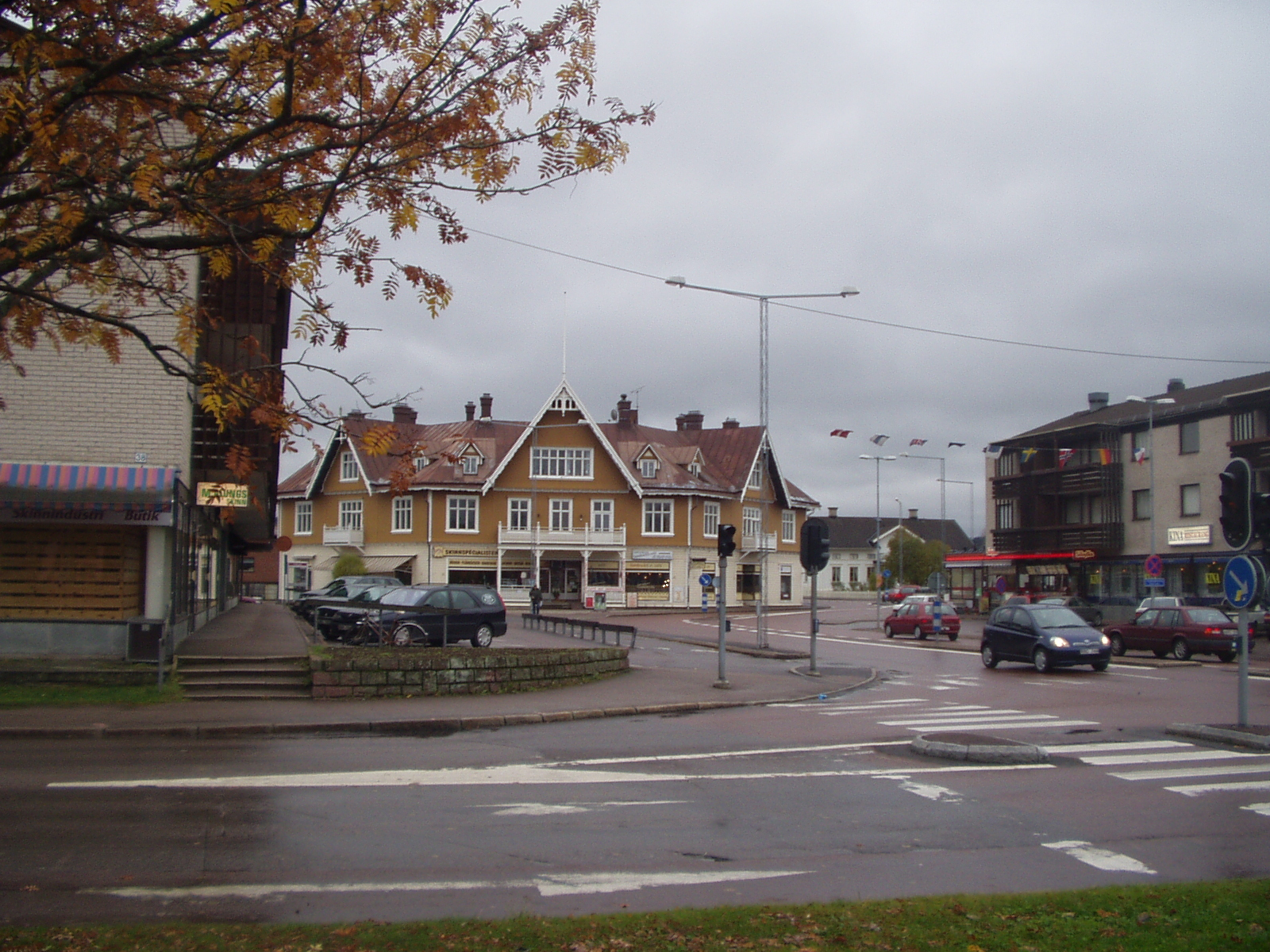

- Coat of arms

- Coordinates: 60°41′N 13°44′E
- Country: Sweden
- County: Dalarna County
- Seat: Malung

Area
  - Total: 4,312.49 km^{2} (1,665.06 sq mi)
  - Land: 4,085.06 km^{2} (1,577.25 sq mi)
  - Water: 227.43 km^{2} (87.81 sq mi)
- Area as of 1 January 2014.

Population (30 June 2025)
  - Total: 10,158
  - Density: 2.4866/km^{2} (6.4403/sq mi)
- Time zone: UTC+1 (CET)
  - Summer (DST): UTC+2 (CEST)
- ISO 3166 code: SE
- Province: Dalarna
- Municipal code: 2023
- Website: www.malung.se
- Density is calculated using land area only.

Malung-Sälen Municipality (Swedish: Malung-Sälens kommun) is a municipality in Dalarna County in central Sweden. Its seat is located in the town of Malung.

Malung Municipality was created in 1971 by the amalgamation of "old" Malung with the adjacent entities Lima and Transtrand. In 2007 the Government of Sweden decided to approve the present name, which took effect on 1 January 2008. The reason for the double name, the only of its kind in Sweden, is to promote the skiing resort area Sälen in the northern part of the municipality.

== Geography ==
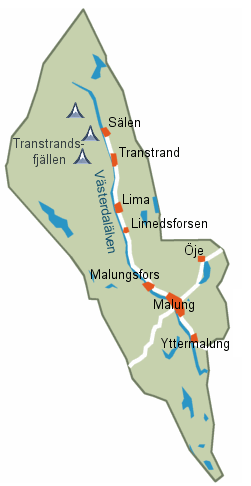
Map of the municipality.

The terrain in the area is largely submontane, with plenty of bog and forest. The Transtrandsfjällen in the north are the southernmost mountains in Sweden, marking the start of the Scandinavian mountain range. Rocks are mostly metamorphic and sedimentary, with occurrences of basalt. Most settlements are located in and around the valley of Västerdalälven river.

=== Localities ===
The municipal population was around 13,000 in the 1960s, but has decreased continually since then.

The villages in the municipality, with population figures from 2005, are:

- Lima (418)
- Limedsforsen (443)
- Malung (seat) (5,146)
- Malungsfors (559)
- Sälen (508) - Is a nationally renowned skiing resort.
- Transtrand (373)
- Yttermalung (216)
- Öje (202) (population figure from 2000)

== Demographics ==
This is a demographic table based on Malung-Sälen Municipality's electoral districts in the 2022 Swedish general election sourced from SVT's election platform, in turn taken from SCB official statistics.

In total there were 10,210 inhabitants, with 7,983 Swedish citizens of voting age. 37.6 % voted for the left coalition and 60.7 % for the right coalition. Indicators are in percentage points except population totals and income.

Location	Residents	Citizen adults	Left vote	Right vote	Employed	Swedish parents	Foreign heritage	Income SEK	Degree
Location			%	%					
Lima	1,530	1,269	23.3	74.5	86	93	7	24,918	23
Malung S	1,880	1,576	46.0	53.0	81	89	11	22,666	27
Malung V	1,555	1,212	36.2	61.7	81	87	13	24,188	27
Malung Ö	2,184	1,558	44.8	53.0	77	73	27	21,725	26
Malungsfors	580	466	37.3	59.8	85	91	9	24,304	23
Transtrand	2,030	1,543	33.4	65.6	86	88	12	28,250	29
Yttermalung	451	359	43.4	55.9	75	87	13	22,369	31
Source: SVT

== Riksdag elections ==
Year	%	Votes	V	S	MP	C	L	KD	M	SD	NyD	Left	Right
1973	91.6	8,101	3.7	47.0		31.9	8.5	1.4	7.7			50.4	48.0
1976	92.7	8,454	3.2	46.3		32.5	8.4	1.1	8.3			49.5	49.3
1979	91.4	8,334	4.3	47.7		27.1	7.3	1.1	12.2			52.0	46.6
1982	91.7	8,307	3.8	49.9	1.4	23.2	5.1	1.0	15.5			53.6	43.7
1985	90.5	8,272	3.6	47.9	1.6	18.4	11.7		16.7			51.5	46.8
1988	86.1	7,762	3.7	47.6	4.4	18.3	10.8	1.5	13.6			55.6	42.7
1991	87.5	7,819	3.3	41.6	2.2	14.4	8.2	5.1	17.1		7.4	44.8	44.7
1994	86.2	7,527	5.9	49.9	3.7	12.3	6.5	2.5	17.7		0.7	59.5	39.1
1998	82.3	6,943	15.0	39.5	2.7	7.4	4.1	9.7	20.6			57.2	41.8
2002	79.2	6,484	9.5	42.7	2.6	11.3	10.0	6.6	14.5	0.6		54.9	42.4
2006	80.8	6,527	7.9	37.8	2.4	11.8	6.3	3.7	26.4	2.1		48.0	48.2
2010	82.8	6,672	6.7	36.5	3.0	8.2	5.8	2.6	30.0	5.7		46.2	46.6
2014	85.3	6.674	4.7	36.2	2.7	8.6	3.7	2.4	22.6	17.3		43.6	37.2
2018	87.0	6,756	6.1	29.0	1.7	9.3	3.2	5.9	19.0	24.6		46.1	52.6
2022	86.4	6,786	4.1	26.2	1.9	5.4	3.3	6.5	18.9	32.1		37.6	60.7

== Education ==
Malung has a folk high school, specialised in folk music and folk dance. One notable former music student is Emma Härdelin.

== See also ==
- Scandinavian Mountains Airport
