= Kovddoskaisi =

Finnish Mountain in the Scandinavian Mountains

- Govddosgáisi
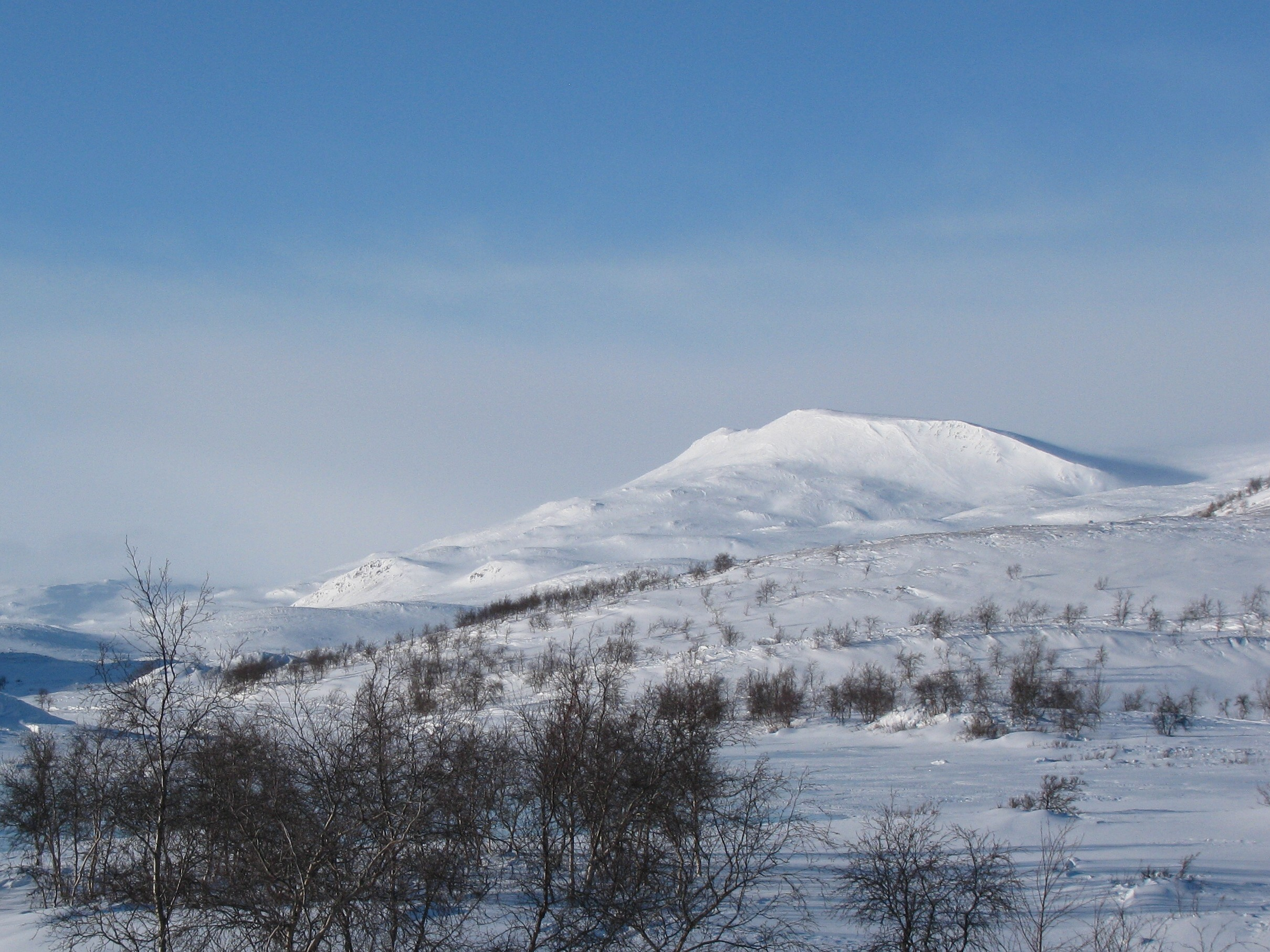

Highest point
- Elevation: 1,242 m (4,074 ft)
- Coordinates: 69°13′24″N 21°10′28″E

Geography
- Location within Finland
- Location: Finland
- Parent range: Scandinavian Mountains

Kovddoskaisi or Govddosgáisi is a finnish mountain in the Lapland, Finland. It is the fourth tallest mountain in Finland. It has a peak of 1,242 m (4,074 ft), and a prominence of 562 m (1,843 ft). Kovddoskaisi is apart of the Scandinavian Mountains, in the northern part of Finland.

Kovddoskaisi is inside of the Käsivarsi Wilderness Area. It is roughly 10.2 kilometers (6.2 miles) away from Halti, Finland's tallest mountain. The closest neighboring mountain to Kovddoskaisi is Ridnitsohkka, which is 9.7 kilometers (6 miles) from Kovddoskaisi.

== See also ==
- Scandinavian Mountains

Media related to Kovddoskaisi at Wikimedia Commons
