= Limedsforsen =

- Location within Dalarna Location within Sweden
- Coordinates: 60°53′24″N 13°23′57″E
- Country: Sweden
- Province: Dalarna
- County: Dalarna County
- Municipality: Malung-Sälen Municipality

Area
  - Total: 3.1654 km^{2} (1.2222 sq mi)

Population (31 December 2010)
  - Total: 441
  - Density: 139/km^{2} (360/sq mi)
- Time zone: UTC+1 (CET)
  - Summer (DST): UTC+2 (CEST)
- Postal code: 6616

Limedsforsen is a locality situated in Malung-Sälen Municipality, Dalarna County, Sweden with 441 inhabitants in 2010. Nearby villages include Ärnäs.
