= Storvätteshågna =

Mountain in Sweden

- Gealta
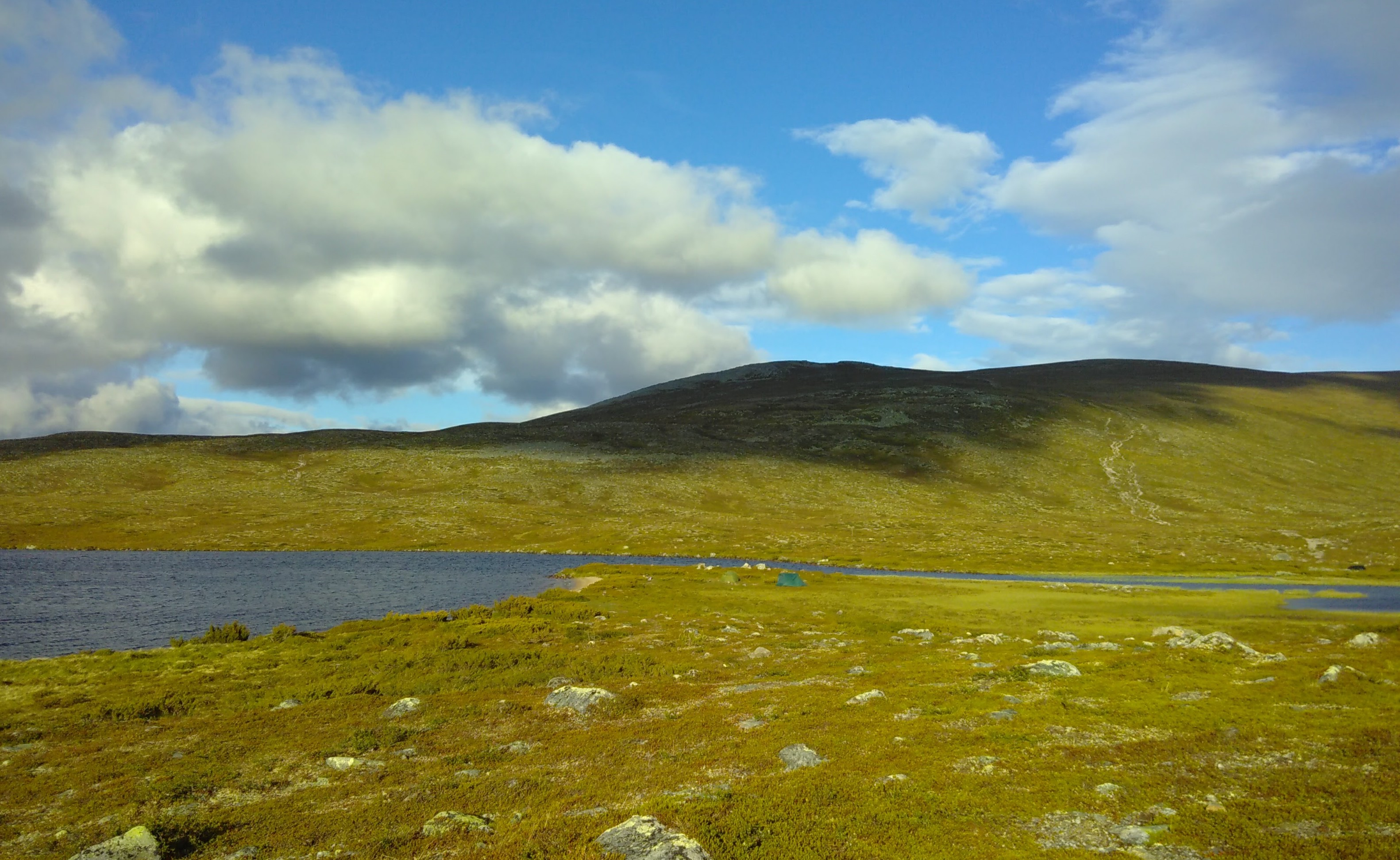
- Storvätteshågna in July 2017

Highest point
- Elevation: 1,204 m (3,950 ft)
- Prominence: 317 m (1,040 ft)
- Coordinates: 62°7′14″N 12°27′8″E

Geography
- Location within Sweden
- Location: Sweden
- Parent range: Scandinavian Mountains

Storvätteshågna (in Sami: Gealta) is a peak of the Långfjället massif in the southern part of the Scandinavian mountain range, near Grövelsjön in Idre parish, Älvdalen Municipality. It is the highest point in Dalarna and Svealand, with an altitude of 1,204 metres.

At the top of the mountain lies a small pond, Santesonstjärnen.

== Etymology ==
Storvätteshågna means "large mountain ridge". The origin of the word "vätte" is uncertain but most likely it refers to Vätte, which is supernatural being in Scandinavian folklore. The name may be interpret as "large mountain ridge of Vätte". The mountain also has Sámi name, Gealta, meaning "mountain top" in Sámi language.
