= Råpi =

Mountain in Sweden

Coordinates: 68°26′N 21°22′E

Råpi (also, Ropi) is a 926 meters high mountain in Norrbotten County, northern Sweden, near Kiruna.
