= Kaskasatjåkka =

Mountain in Sweden

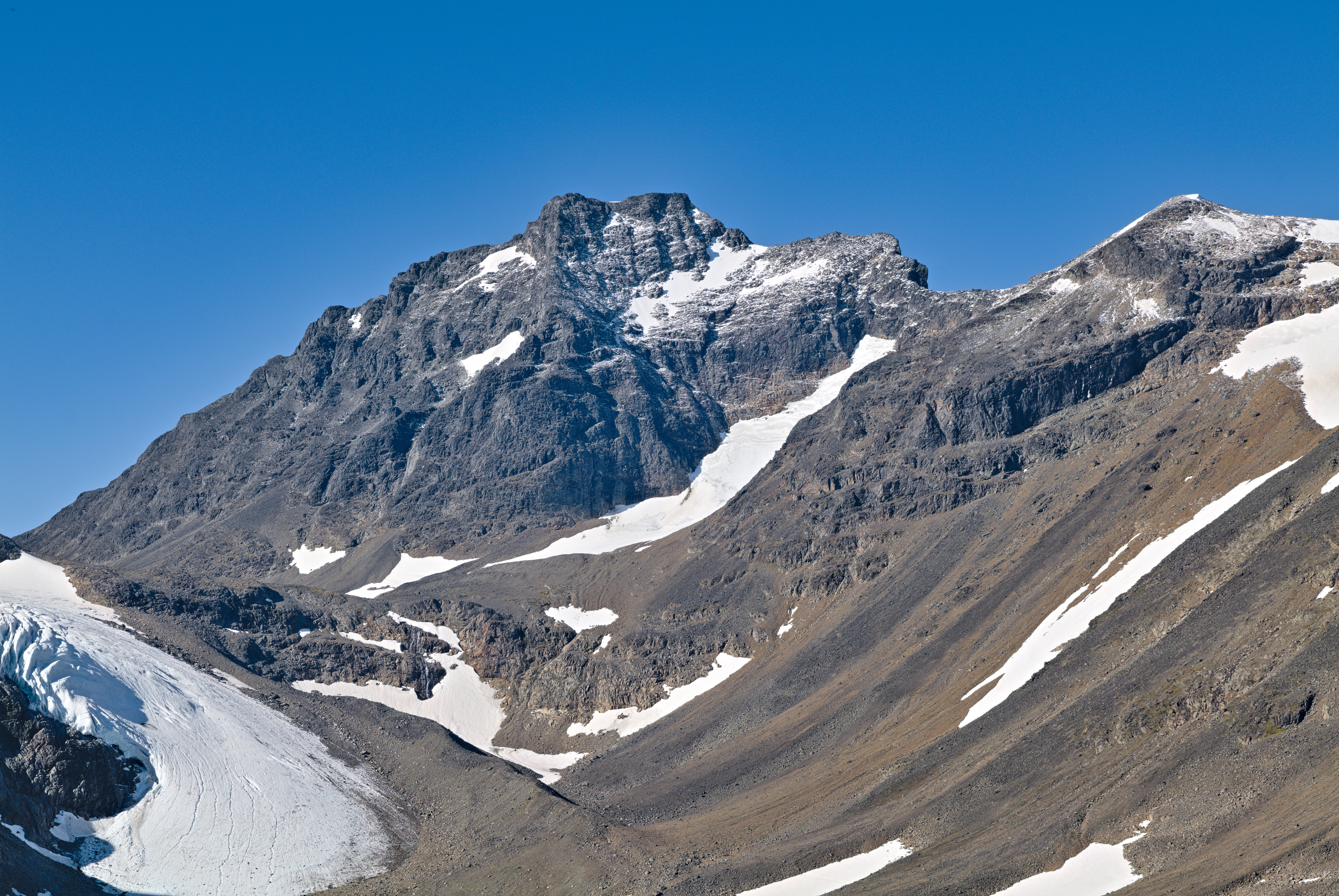
- Kaskasatjåkka in August 2022 seen from the Tarfala valley

Highest point
- Elevation: 2,071 m (6,795 ft)
- Prominence: 576 m (1,890 ft)
- Isolation: 4.77 km (2.96 mi) to Kebnekaise
- Coordinates: 67°56′32″N 18°34′47″E

Geography
- Location within Sweden
- Location: Lapland, Sweden
- Parent range: Scandinavian Mountains

Kaskasatjåkka is a mountain in Sweden with an elevation of 2,071 metres (6,795 ft) above mean sea level (AMSL). Its peak is located about three kilometres (1.9 miles) north of the mountain huts and research station in the Tarfala Valley.
