= Öje =

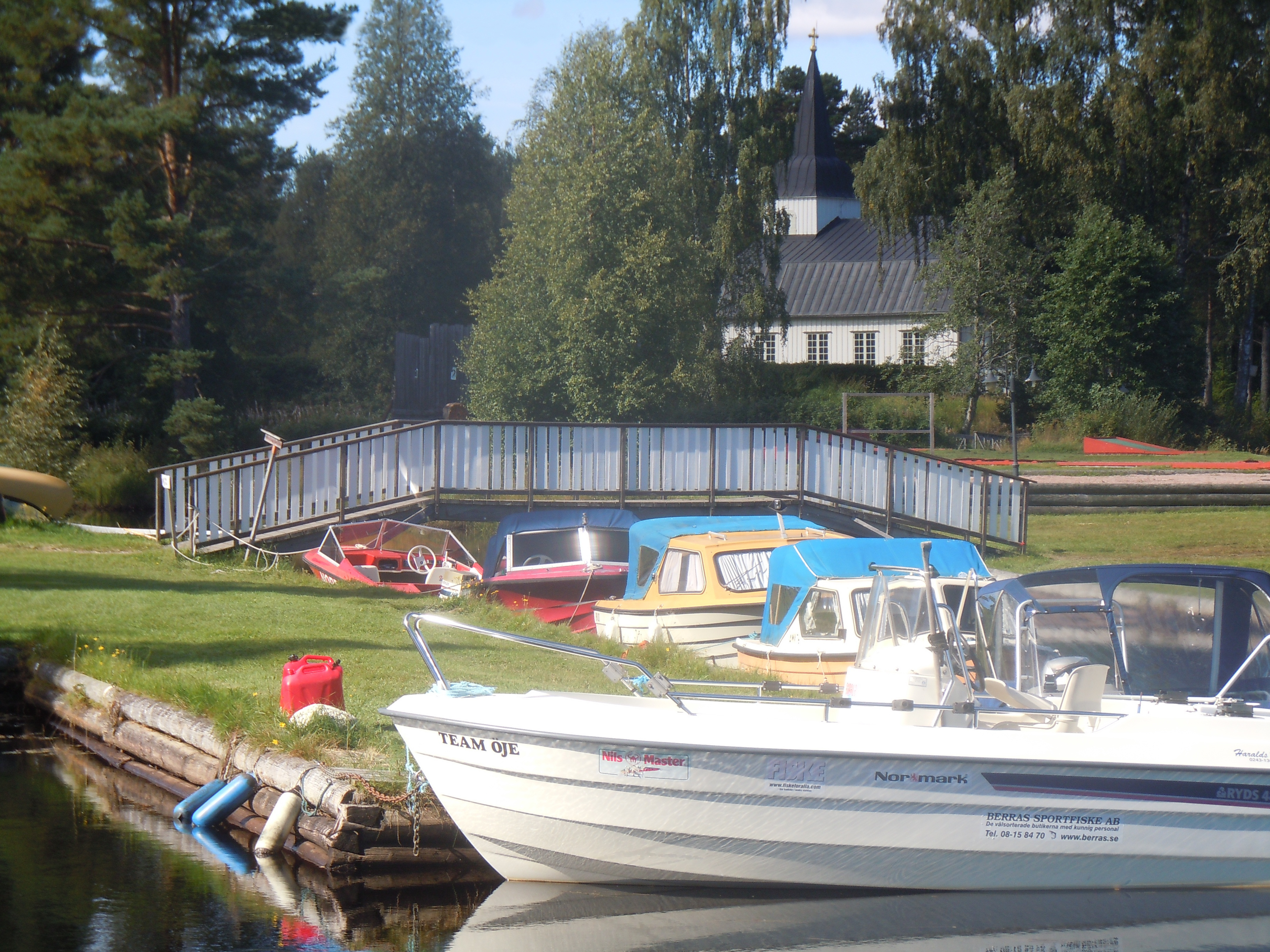

- Location within Dalarna Location within Sweden
- Coordinates: 60°49′N 13°51′E
- Country: Sweden
- Province: Dalarna
- County: Dalarna County
- Municipality: Malung-Sälen Municipality

Population (2005-12-31)
  - Total: 162
- Time zone: UTC+1 (CET)
  - Summer (DST): UTC+2 (CEST)

Öje is a village in Malung-Sälen Municipality, Dalarna, Sweden. Its population was 162 people in 2010.

Several factories for manufacturing clothing and consumer products from leather were located in Öje in the 20th century. The leather industry declined and the manufacturers were closed in the 1970s and 1980s. A museum displaying and commemorating the leather manufacturing industry is located in one of the former factory buildings in Öje.

== Öje chapel ==
A chapel probably existed in Öje in the 16th century; it was first described in 1631. In 1655 a new chapel was built in the same location. This was completely rebuilt in 1828–1830, and further rebuilt and renovated in 1912 and in the 1980s.
