= Helagsfjället =

Mountain in Sweden

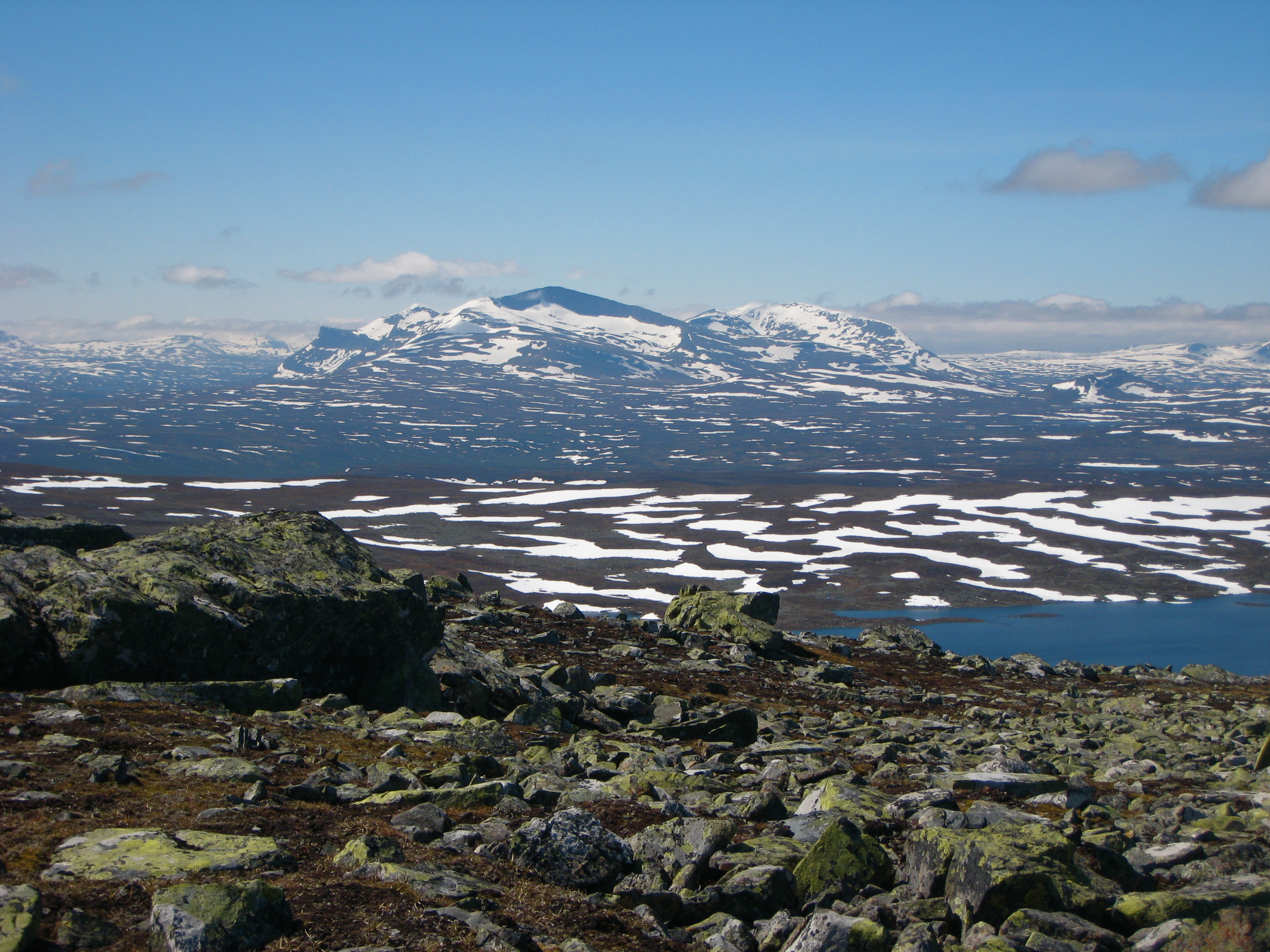
- Helags during summer

Highest point
- Elevation: 1,796 m (5,892 ft)
- Prominence: 1,133 m (3,717 ft)
- Isolation: 151.6 km (94.2 mi) to Storsølnkletten
- Coordinates: 62°54′N 12°27′E

Geography
- Location: Härjedalen, Sweden
- Parent range: Scandinavian Mountains

Helagsfjället, the mountain of Helags, is a mountain in Härjedalen, Sweden, and is part of the Scandinavian Mountains. The peak reaches 1,797 metres above sea level, which makes it the highest mountain in Sweden south of the Arctic Circle. Its glacier is the country's southernmost.
