= Ridnitšohkka =

Second-highest point in Finland

- Ritničohkka
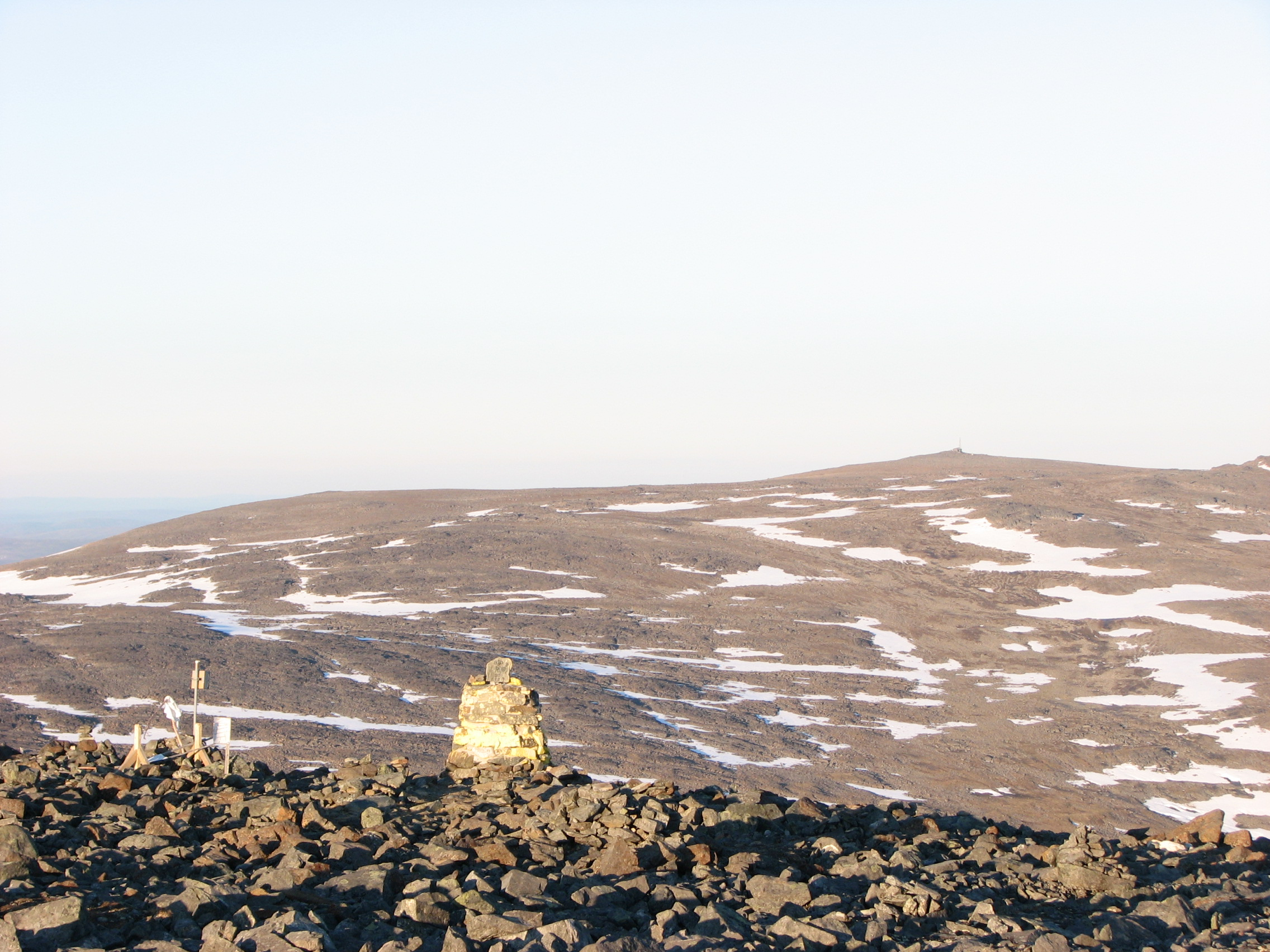
- Ridnitsohkka as seen from Halti.

Highest point
- Elevation: 1,317 m (4,321 ft)
- Coordinates: 69°17′16″N 021°20′19″E

Geography
- Location within Lapland Location within Finland
- Location: Käsivarsi Wilderness Area, Enontekiö, Lapland, Finland
- Parent range: Scandinavian Mountains

Ridnitšohkka (Northern Sami: Ritničohkka) is the second-highest point in Finland, though it is the highest mountain with its peak within Finland. The eastern face is steep while the western side is mild. While somewhat popular destination among off-piste skiers, the remoteness (50 km or 31 mi from the nearest settlement) of this mountain makes it very isolated. The mast on the top is for telecommunications, so the emergency services are somewhat available there, which is not true for many other locations in the area.

Ridnitšohkka has the most extensive area of permanent snow in Finland. However, during the past years the size of the snowfield has considerably diminished.
