= Tomtabacken =

Hill in Sweden

Coordinates: 57°30′02″N 14°28′13″E

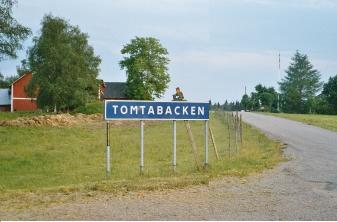

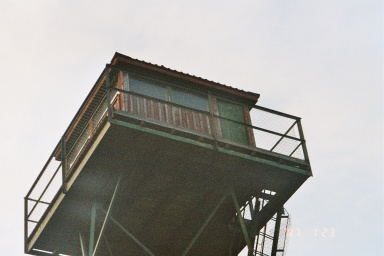
The tower from beneath

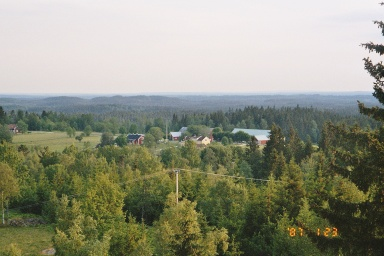
View from the Tomtabacken tower

Tomtabacken is a hill in the province of Småland, Sweden.

It is situated in the southern part of the Nässjö Municipality, about 22 km southwest from Nässjö town. The summit area is quite flat, and it has a lookout tower which affords a view over the forested Småland landscape. With a height of 377 meters (1,237 ft), Tomtabacken is the highest point in Småland province and in the southern land of Götaland.

The summit of Tomtabacken is accessible by road from the nearby towns of Malmbäck or Vrigstad, or on foot along the Höglandsleden trail, which passes beside the lookout tower.

== Climate ==
Temperatures on Tomtabacken are lower all year round than those of the surrounding area.

In January the mean daily temperature on the summit falls to around -4°C, which is similar to the temperature in Dalsland or Uppland, both of which are significantly further north. In July the mean daily temperature only reaches around 14°C, comparable with Jokkmokk on the Arctic Circle. The annual mean daily temperature is below 5°C, comparable to Hudiksvall. Although snowfall usually occurs from November to April, in the nearby village of Spinkabo measurable snowfall was observed on 30 September 1995 (12 cm) and 14 June 1982 (7 cm). Since only three months have a mean daily temperature exceeding 10°C, the climate qualifies as subarctic.

Climate data for Tomtabacken 1961–1990
Month	Jan	Feb	Mar	Apr	May	Jun	Jul	Aug	Sep	Oct	Nov	Dec	Year
Daily mean °C (°F)	−4.2 (24.4)	−4.4 (24.1)	−1.6 (29.1)	3.3 (37.9)	9.1 (48.4)	13.2 (55.8)	14.2 (57.6)	13.4 (56.1)	9.8 (49.6)	5.6 (42.1)	0.8 (33.4)	−2.4 (27.7)	4.7 (40.5)
Average precipitation mm (inches)	57.8 (2.28)	38.7 (1.52)	44.6 (1.76)	43.7 (1.72)	50.7 (2.00)	61.8 (2.43)	78.7 (3.10)	73.3 (2.89)	81.9 (3.22)	69.4 (2.73)	71.3 (2.81)	62.8 (2.47)	734.6 (28.92)
