= Scandinavian Mountains =

Mountain range in Finland, Norway, and Sweden

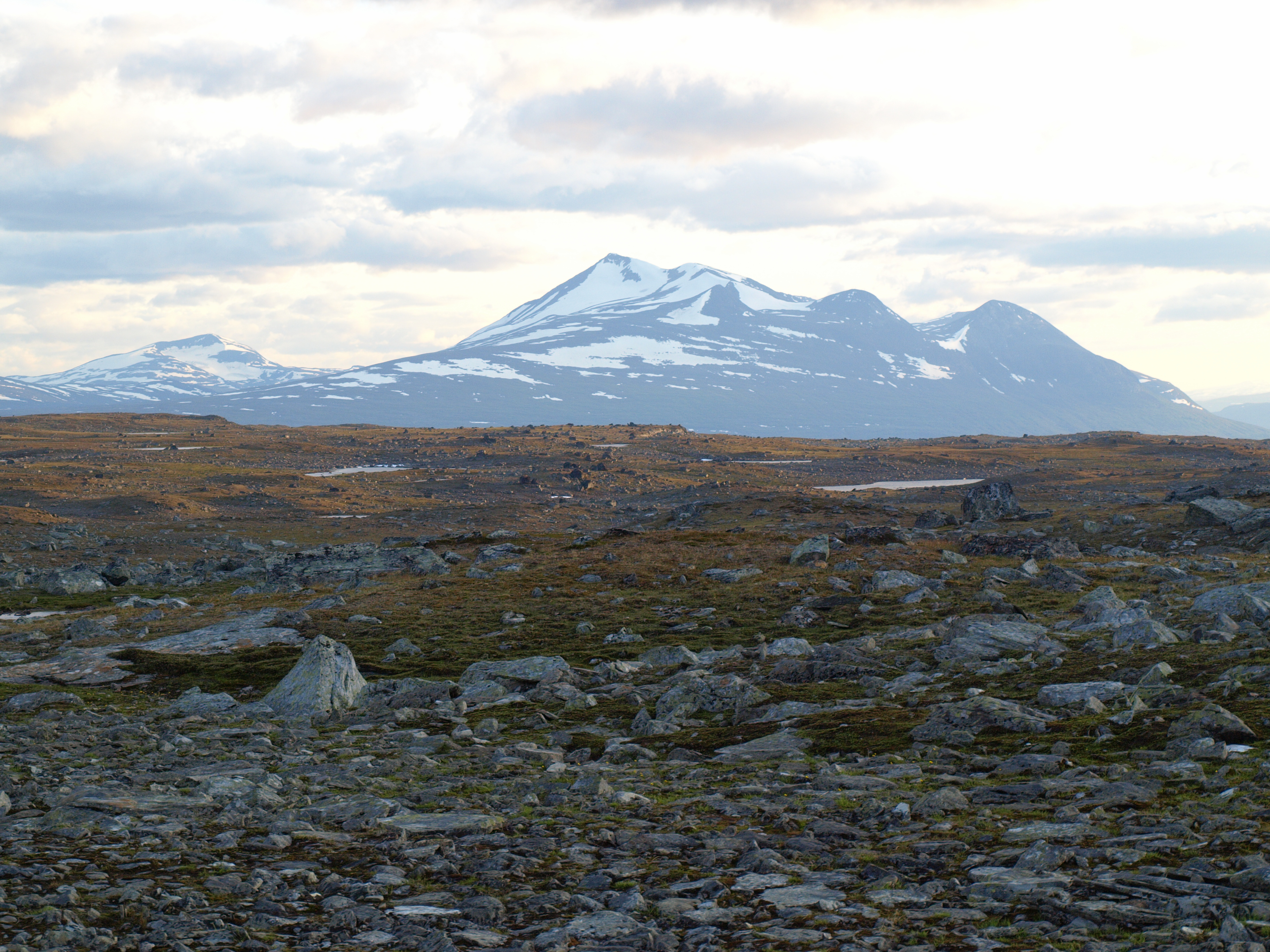
- Mount Áhkká in Stora Sjöfallet National Park, northern Sweden

Highest point
- Peak: Galdhøpiggen, Lom, Norway
- Elevation: 2,469 m (8,100 ft)
- Coordinates: 61°38′11″N 08°18′45″E

Dimensions
- Length: 1,700 km (1,100 mi)
- Width: 320 km (200 mi)

Naming
- Native name: Fjellet, Kjølen (Norwegian); Skanderna, Fjällen (Swedish); Skandit, Köli (Finnish)

Geography
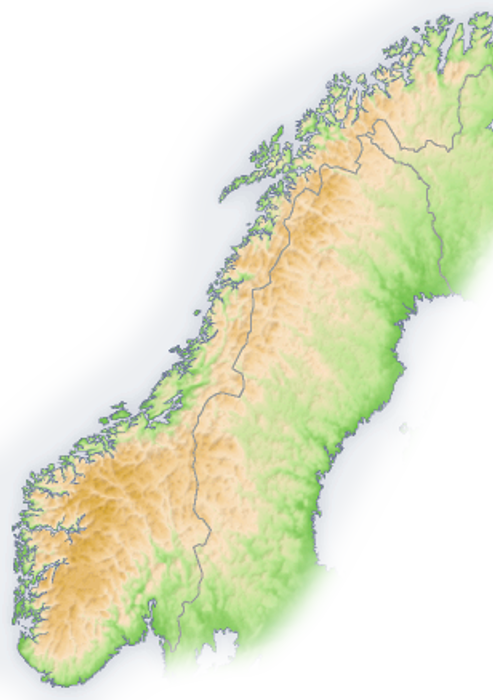
- The Scandinavian Mountains
- Countries: Finland, Norway and Sweden
- Range coordinates: 65°N 14°E

The Scandinavian Mountains or the Scandes is a mountain range that runs through the Scandinavian Peninsula. The western sides of the mountains drop precipitously into the North Sea and Norwegian Sea, forming the fjords of Norway, whereas to the northeast they gradually curve towards Finland. To the north they form the border between Norway and Sweden, reaching 2,000 metres (6,600 ft) high at the Arctic Circle. The mountain range just touches northwesternmost Finland but are scarcely more than hills at their northernmost extension at the North Cape (Nordkapp).

The mountains are relatively high for a range so young and are very steep in places; Galdhøpiggen in South Norway is the highest peak in mainland Northern Europe, at 2,469 metres (8,100 ft); Kebnekaise is the highest peak on the Swedish side, at 2,096.8 m (6,879 ft), whereas the slope of Halti is the highest point in Finland, at 1,324 m (4,344 ft), although the peak of Halti is situated in Norway.

The Scandinavian montane birch forest and grasslands terrestrial ecoregion is closely associated with the mountain range.

== Names in Scandinavia ==
In Swedish, the mountain range is called Skandinaviska fjällkedjan, Skanderna (encyclopedic and professional usage), Fjällen ('the Fells', common in colloquial speech) or Kölen ('the Keel'). In Norwegian, it is called Den skandinaviske fjellkjede, Fjellet, Skandesfjellene, Kjølen ('the Keel') or Nordryggen ('the North Ridge', name coined in 2013). The names Kölen and Kjølen are often preferentially used for the northern part, where the mountains form a narrow range near the border region of Norway and Sweden. In South Norway, there is a broad scatter of mountain regions with individual names, such as Dovrefjell, Hardangervidda, Jotunheimen, and Rondane.

== Orography ==
The mountain chain's highest summits are mostly concentrated in an area of mean altitude of over 1,000 m (3,300 ft),) between Stavanger and Trondheim in South Norway, with numerous peaks over 1,300 m (4,300 ft) and some peaks over 2,000 m (6,600 ft). Around Trondheim Fjord, peaks decrease in altitude to about 400–500 m (1,300–1,600 ft), rising again to heights in excess of 1,900 m (6,200 ft) further north in Swedish Lapland and nearby areas of Norway. (Note: The two high areas, north and south of Trondheim, have been usually referred to as "domes" but technically they are not geological domes.) The southern part of the mountain range contains the highest mountain of Northern Europe, Galdhøpiggen at almost 2,500 m (8,200 ft). This part of the mountain chain is also broader and contains a series of plateaux and gently undulating surfaces that hosts scattered inselbergs. The plateaux and undulating surfaces of the southern Scandinavian Mountains form a series of stepped surfaces. Geomorphologist Karna Lidmar-Bergström and co-workers recognize five widespread stepped surfaces. In eastern Norway, some of the stepped surfaces merge into a single surface. Dovrefjell and Jotunheimen are rises from the highest of the stepped surfaces. In south-western Norway, the plateaux and gently undulating surfaces are strongly dissected by fjords and valleys. The mountain chain is present in Sweden from northern Dalarna northwards; south of this point the Scandinavian Mountains lie completely within Norway. Most of the Scandinavian Mountains lack "alpine topography", (Note: A topography classification study found that 13.6% of the area of southern Norway has a proper "alpine relief", and that this is mostly concentrated in the fjord region of southwestern Norway and the valley of Gudbrandsdalen. About half of the "alpine relief" area is characterized has steep slopes and over-deepened glacial valleys. The other half is made up of coastal mountains and intermediate-relief glacial valleys.) and where present it does not relate to altitude. An example of this is the distribution of cirques in southern Norway that can be found both near sea level and at 2,000 m (6,600 ft). Most cirques are found between 1,000 and 1,500 m (3,300 and 4,900 ft).

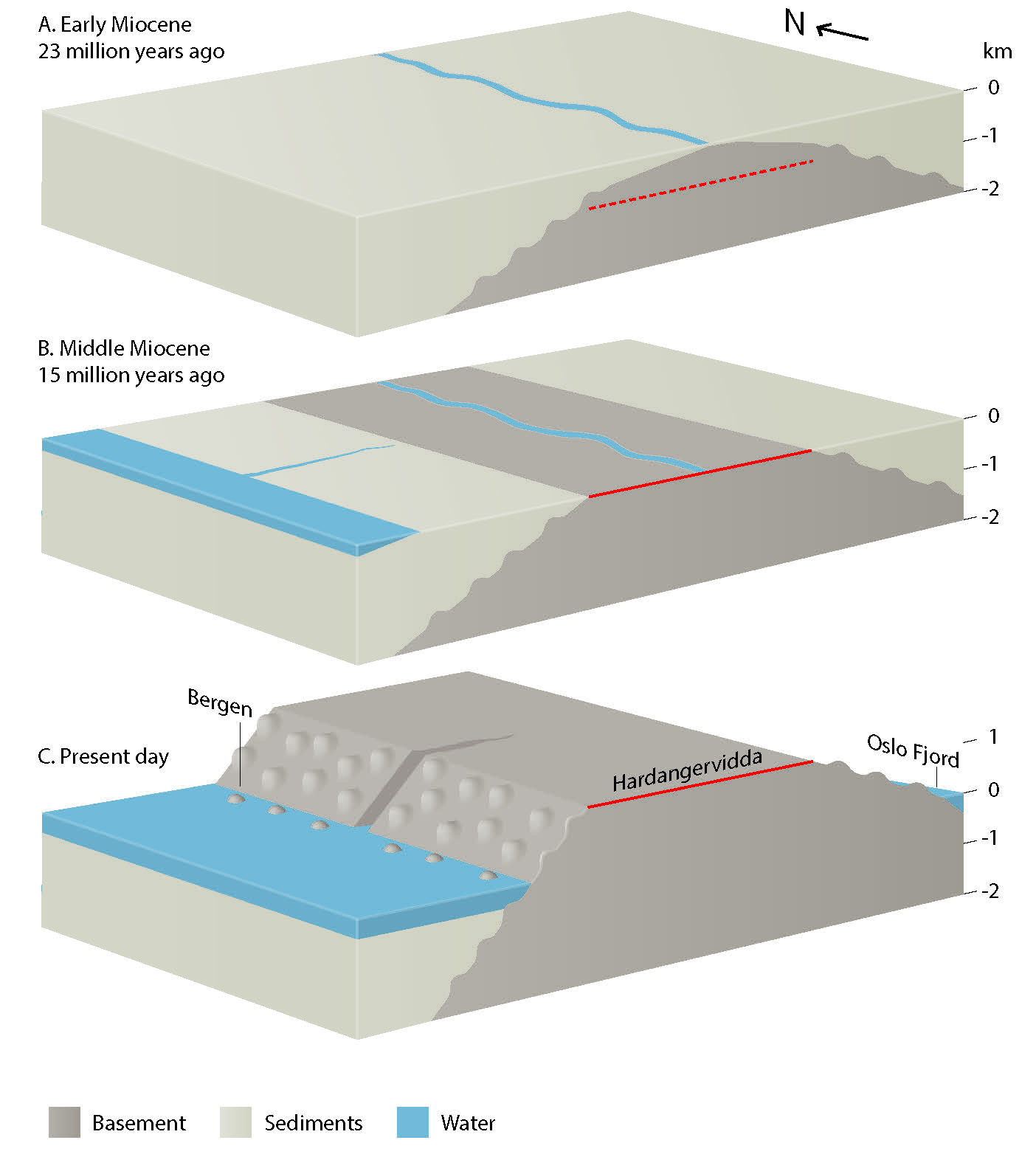
Formation of the mountains of southern Norway (the Southern Scandes).

To the east, the Scandinavian Mountains proper bound with mountains that are lower and less dissected and are known in Swedish as the förfjäll (literally 'fore-fell'). Generally the förfjäll do not surpass 1,000 m (3,300 ft) above sea level. As a geomorphic unit the förfjäll extends across Sweden as a 650 km (400 mi) long and 40-to-80 km (25-to-50 mi) broad belt from Dalarna in the south to Norrbotten in the north. While lower than the Scandinavian Mountains proper, the förfjäll's pronounced relief, its large number of plateaux, and its coherent valley system distinguish it from so-called undulating hilly terrain (Swedish: bergkullsterräng) and plains with residual hills (Swedish: bergkullslätt) found further east.

== Climate, permafrost and glaciers ==
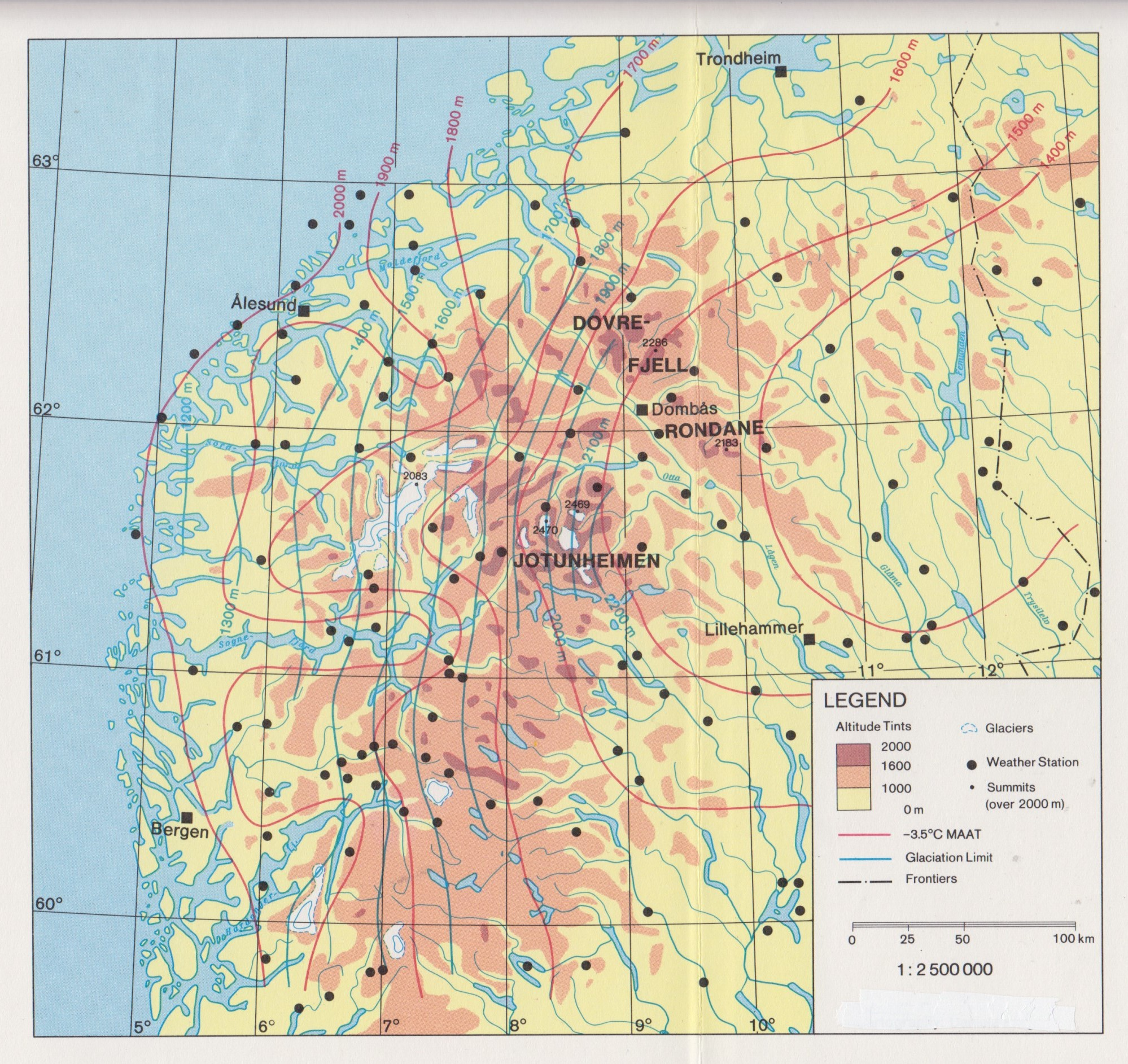
Topographic map of the Jotunheimen and Dovre Rondane areas. Widespread alpine permafrost may be expected at the altitude of the -3.5°C MAAT (red). The glaciation limit (blue) shows the opposite trend.

The climate of the Nordic countries is maritime along the coast of Norway, and much more continental in Sweden in the rain shadow of the Scandinavian Mountains. The combination of a northerly location and moisture from the North Atlantic Ocean has caused the formation of many ice fields and glaciers. In the mountains, the air temperature decreases with increasing altitude, and patches of mountain permafrost in regions with a mean annual air temperature (MAAT) of −1.5 °C (29.5 °F) will be found at wind exposed sites with little snow cover during winter. Higher up, widespread permafrost may be expected at altitudes with a MAAT of −3.5 °C (25.5 °F), continuous permafrost at altitudes with a MAAT of −6 °C (21 °F).

Within the EU-sponsored project PACE (Permafrost and Climate in Europe), a 100 m (330 ft) deep borehole was drilled in bedrock above Tarfala research station at an altitude of 1,540 m (5,050 ft) above sea level. The stable ground temperature at a depth of 100 metres (330 ft) is still −2.75 °C (27.05 °F). The measured geothermal gradient in the drillhole of 1.17 °C /100 m allows to extrapolate a permafrost thickness of 330 metres (1,080 ft), a further proof that continuous permafrost exists in these altitudes and above, up to the top of Kebnekaise.

In the Scandinavian Mountains, the lower limit of widespread discontinuous permafrost drops from 1,700 metres (5,600 ft) in the west of southern Norway to 1,500 metres (4,900 ft) near the border with Sweden, and from 1,600 metres (5,200 ft) in northern Norway to 1,100 metres (3,600 ft) in northern, more continental Sweden (Kebnekaise area). In contrast to the lower limit of permafrost, the mean glacier altitude (or glaciation limit) is related to the amount of precipitation. Thus the snow line, or glacier equilibrium line as the limit between the accumulation zone and ablation zone shows the opposite trend, from 1,500 metres (4,900 ft) in the west (Jostefonn) to 2,100 metres (6,900 ft) in the east (Jotunheimen).

== Geology ==
=== Bedrock ===
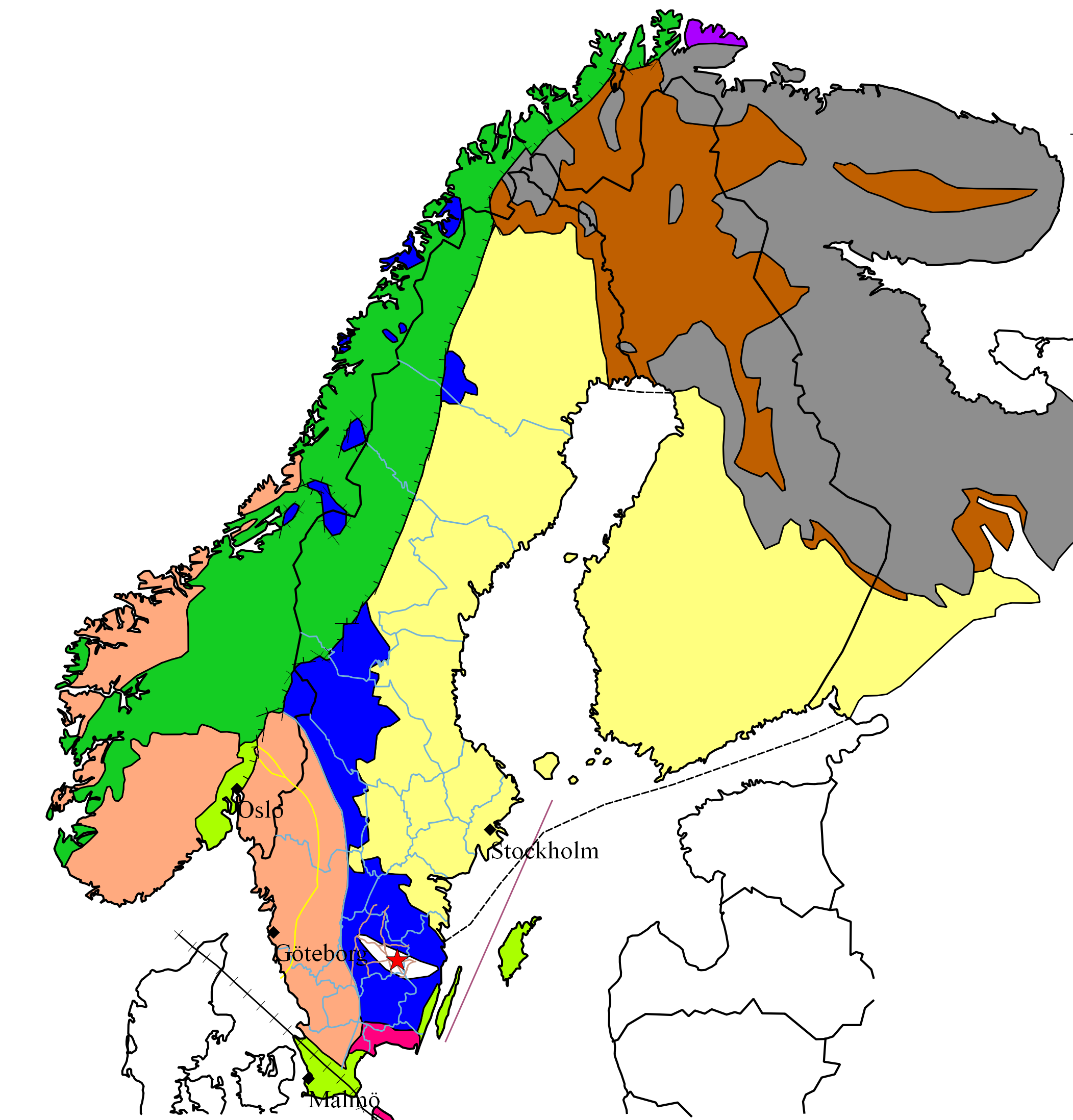
Simplified geological map of Fennoscandia. The Caledonian nappes are shown in green. Note the windows of bedrock belonging to the Transscandinavian Igneous Belt in blue. The Svecofennian and Sveconorwegian provinces are shown in yellow and salmon respectively.

Reconstruction showing the collision of three paleocontinents during Caledonian orogeny approximately 390 million years ago. The red line shows where the Iapetus Suture extends in the present day. Note that Scandinavian Caledonides were just one branch of the Caledonian orogeny that affected much of what is now Europe.

Most of the rocks of the Scandinavian Mountains are Caledonian, which means they were put in place by the Caledonian orogeny. Caledonian rocks overlie rocks of the much older Svecokarelian and Sveconorwegian provinces. The Caledonian rocks actually form large nappes (Swedish: skollor) that have been thrust over the older rocks. Much of the Caledonian rocks have been eroded since they were put in place, meaning that they were once thicker and more contiguous. It is also implied from the erosion that the nappes of Caledonian rock once reached further east than they do today. The erosion has left remaining massifs of Caledonian rocks and windows of Precambrian rock.

While there are some disagreements, geologists generally recognize four units among the nappes: an uppermost, an upper, a middle and a lower unit. The lower unit is made up Ediacaran (Vendian), Cambrian, Ordovician and Silurian-aged sedimentary rocks. Pieces of Precambrian shield rocks are in some places also incorporated into the lower nappes.

It was during the Silurian and Devonian periods that the Caledonian nappes were stacked upon the older rocks and upon themselves. This occurred in connection with the closure of the Iapetus Ocean as the ancient continents of Laurentia and Baltica collided. This collision produced a Himalayan-sized mountain range named the Caledonian Mountains roughly over the same area as the present-day Scandinavian Mountains. The Caledonian Mountains began a post-orogenic collapse in the Devonian, implying tectonic extension and subsidence. Despite occurring in about the same area, the ancient Caledonian Mountains and the modern Scandinavian Mountains are unrelated. (Note: The overlap between the Scandinavian Caledonides and the Scandinavian Mountains has led to various suggestions that the modern Scandinavian Mountains are a remnant of the Caledonide mountains. A version of this argument was put forward in 2009 with the claim that the uplift of the mountains was attained by buoyancy of the surviving "mountain roots" of the Caledonian orogen. This concept has been criticized since, at present, there is only a tiny "mountain root" beneath the southern Scandinavian Mountains and no "root" at all in the north. Further, the Caledonian Mountains in Scandinavia are known to have undergone orogenic collapse for a long period starting in the Devonian. Another problem with this model is that it does not explain why other former mountains dating back to the Caledonian orogeny are eroded and buried in sediments and not uplifted by their "roots".)

=== Origin ===
The origin of today's mountain topography is debated by geologists. Geologically, the Scandinavian Mountains are an elevated, passive continental margin similar to the mountains and plateaux found on the opposite side of the North Atlantic in Eastern Greenland or in Australia's Great Dividing Range. The Scandinavian Mountains attained their height by tectonic processes different from orogeny, chiefly in the Cenozoic. A two-stage model of uplift has been proposed for the Scandinavian Mountains in South Norway. A first stage in the Mesozoic and a second stage starting from the Oligocene. The uplift of South Norway has elevated the westernmost extension of the sub-Cambrian peneplain which forms part of what is known as the Paleic surface (Note: After being first described by Hans Reusch in 1901 the Paleic surface was the subject of various interpretations in the 20th century.) in Norway. In South Norway, the Scandinavian Mountains had their main uplift phase later (Neogene) than in northern Scandinavia which had its main phase of uplift in the Paleogene. For example, the Hardangervidda uplifted from sea level to its present 1,200–1,100 m (3,900–3,600 ft) in Early Pliocene times.

The various episodes of uplift of the Scandinavian Mountains were similar in orientation and tilted land surfaces to the east while allowing rivers to incise the landscape. Some of the tilted surfaces constitute the Muddus plains landscape of northern Sweden. The progressive tilt contributed to create the parallel drainage pattern of northern Sweden. Uplift is thought to have been accommodated by coast-parallel normal faults and not by fault-less doming. Therefore, the common labelling of the southern Scandinavian Mountains and the northern Scandinavian Mountains as two domes is misleading. There are divided opinions on the relation between the coastal plains of Norway, the strandflat, and the uplift of the mountains. (Note: Tormod Klemsdal regard the strandflat as old surfaces shaped by deep weathering that escaped the uplift that affected the Scandinavian Mountains, a view concordant with a Triassic (c. 210 million years ago) origin for the strandflat postulated in the 2010s by Odleiv Olesen, Ola Fredin and their respective co-workers. Yet Hans Holtedahl claimed in 1998 that strandflats formed after a Tertiary uplift the mountains noting however that in Trøndelag between Nordland and Western Norway the strandflat could be a surface formed before the Jurassic, then buried in sediments and at some point freed from this cover. Haakon Fossen and co-workers added to the debate in 2017 that movement of geological faults in the Late Mesozoic should imply the strandflats of Western Norway took their final shape after the Late Jurassic or else they would occur at various heights above sea level.)

Unlike orogenic mountains, there is no widely accepted geophysical model to explain elevated passive continental margins such as the Scandinavian Mountains. Various mechanisms of uplift have, however, been proposed over the years. A 2012 study argues that the Scandinavian Mountains and other elevated passive continental margins most likely share the same mechanism of uplift and that this mechanism is related to far-field stresses in Earth's lithosphere. The Scandinavian Mountains can according to this view be likened to a giant anticlinal lithospheric fold. Folding could have been caused by horizontal compression acting on a thin to thick crust transition zone (as are all passive margins).

Alternative lines of research have stressed the role of climate in inducing erosion that induces an isostatic compensation; fluvial and glacial erosion and incision during the Quaternary is thought to have contributed to the uplift of the mountain by forcing an isostatic response. The total amount of uplift produced by this mechanism could be as much as 500 m (1,600 ft). Other geoscientists have implied diapirism in the asthenosphere as being the cause of uplift. One hypothesis states that the early uplift of the Scandinavian Mountains could be indebted to changes in the density of the lithosphere and asthenosphere caused by the Iceland plume when Greenland and Scandinavia rifted apart about 53 million years ago.

=== Quaternary geology ===
Many slopes and valleys are straight because they follow tectonic fractures that are more prone to erosion. Another result of tectonics in the relief is that slopes corresponding to footwalls of normal faults tend to be straight. There is evidence that the drainage divide between the Norwegian Sea and the south-east flowing rivers were once further west. Glacial erosion is thought to have contributed to the shift of the divide, which in some cases ought to have been in excess of 50 km. Much of the Scandinavian Mountains has been sculpted by glacial erosion. The mountain chain is dotted with glacial cirques usually separated from each other by pre-glacial paleosurfaces. Glacier erosion has been limited in these paleosurfaces which form usually plateaus between valleys. As such the paleosurfaces were subject of diverging and slow ice flow during the glaciations. In contrast valleys concentrated ice flow forming fast glaciers or ice streams. At some locations coalesced cirques form arêtes and pyramidal peaks. Glacial reshaping of valleys is more marked in the western part of the mountain chain where drowned glacier-shaped valleys constitute the fjords of Norway. In the eastern part of the mountain chain, glacial reshaping of valleys is weaker. Many mountain tops contain blockfields which escaped glacial erosion either by having been nunataks in the glacial periods or by being protected from erosion under cold-based glacier ice. Karst systems, with their characteristic caves and sinkholes, occur at various places in the Scandinavian Mountains, but are more common in the northern parts. Present-day karst systems might have long histories dating back to the Pleistocene or even earlier. Much of the mountain range is mantled by deposits of glacial origin including till blankets, moraines, drumlins and glaciofluvial material in the form of outwash plains and eskers. Bare rock surfaces are more common in the western side of the mountain range. Although the ages of these deposits and landforms vary, most of them were formed in connection to the Weichselian glaciation and the subsequent deglaciation.

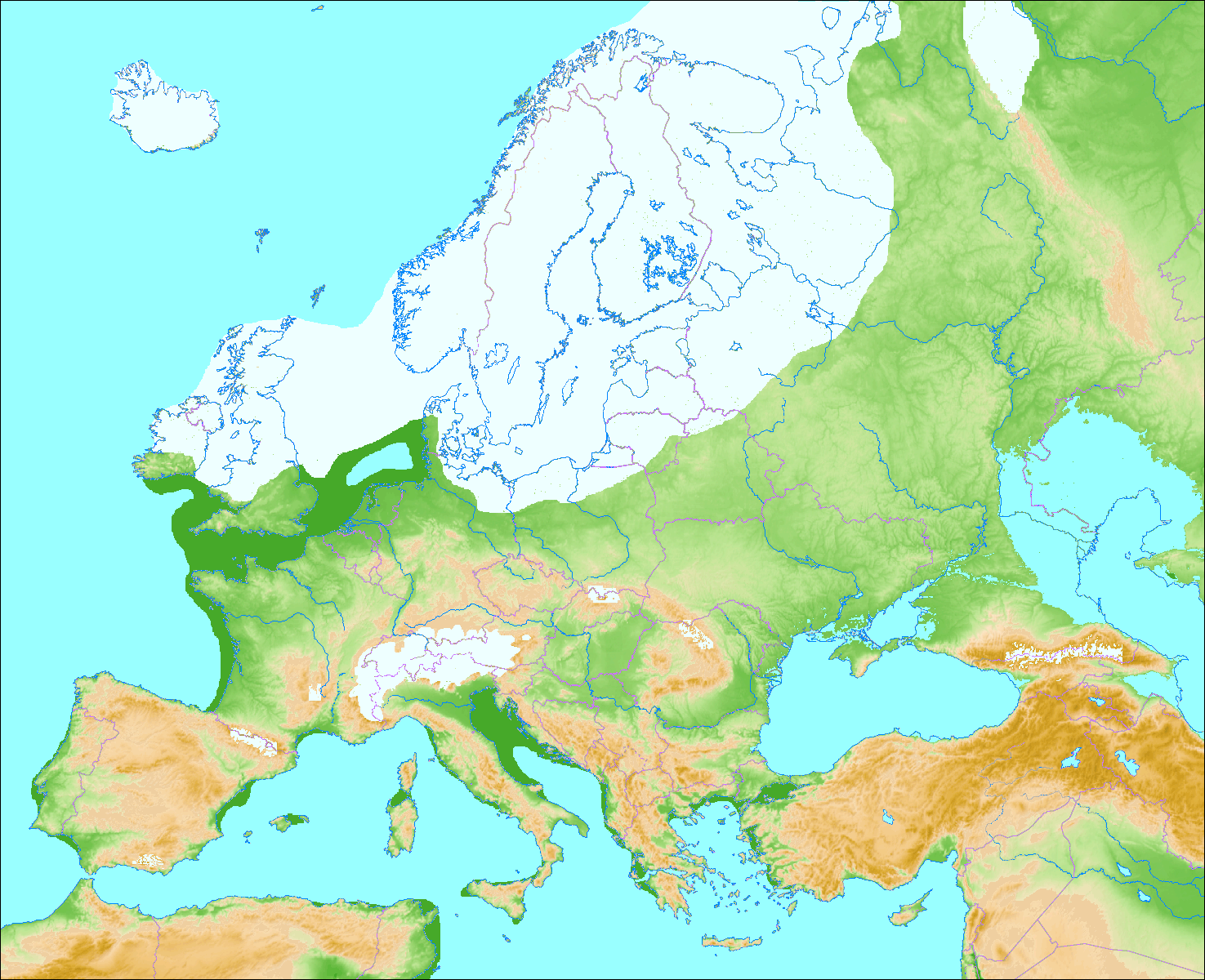
Reconstruction of Europe during the Last Glacial Maximum of the Weichselian and Würm glaciations periods. note that the whole of the Scandinavian Mountains are covered with glacier ice (white).

The Cenozoic glaciations that affected Fennoscandia most likely began in the Scandinavian Mountains. It is estimated that during 50% of the last 2.75 million years the Scandinavian Mountains hosted mountain-centered ice caps and ice fields. The ice fields from which the Fennoscandian Ice Sheet grew out multiple times most likely resembled today's ice fields in Andean Patagonia. (Note: These are the Northern Patagonian Ice Field, Southern Patagonian Ice Field and the Gran Campo Nevado.) During the Last Glacial Maximum (ca. 20 ka BP) all the Scandinavian Mountains were covered by the Fennoscandian Ice Sheet, which extended well beyond the mountains into Denmark, Germany, Poland and the former USSR. As the ice margin started to recede 22–17 ka BP the ice sheet became increasingly concentrated in the Scandinavian Mountains. Recession of the ice margin led the ice sheet to be concentrated in two parts of the Scandinavian Mountains, one part in South Norway and another in northern Sweden and Norway. These two centres were for a time linked, so that the linkage constituted a major drainage barrier that formed various large ephemeral ice-dammed lakes. About 10 ka BP, the linkage had disappeared and so did the southern centre of the ice sheet a thousand years later. The northern centre remained a few hundred years more, and by 9,7 ka BP the eastern Sarek Mountains hosted the last remnant of the Fennoscandian Ice Sheet. As the ice sheet retreated to the Scandinavian Mountains it was dissimilar to the early mountain glaciation that gave origin to the ice sheet as the ice divide lagged behind as the ice mass concentrated in the west.

== Highest mountains ==
=== Norway ===
Of the 10 highest mountain peaks in Scandinavia (prominence greater than 30 m or 98 ft), six are situated in Innlandet county, Norway. The other four are situated in Vestland county, Norway.

1. 2,469 m (8,100 ft) Galdhøpiggen (Innlandet)
2. 2,465 m (8,087 ft) Glittertind (Innlandet)
3. 2,405 m (7,890 ft) Store Skagastølstind (Vestland)
4. 2,387 m (7,831 ft) Store Styggedalstinden east (Vestland)
5. 2,373 m (7,785 ft) Skarstind (Innlandet)
6. 2,369 m (7,772 ft) Vesle Galdhøpiggen (Innlandet)
7. 2,368 m (7,769 ft) Surtningssue (Innlandet)
8. 2,366 m (7,762 ft) Store Memurutinden (Innlandet)
9. 2,351 m (7,713 ft) Jervvasstind (Vestland)
10. 2,348 m (7,703 ft) Sentraltind (Vestland)
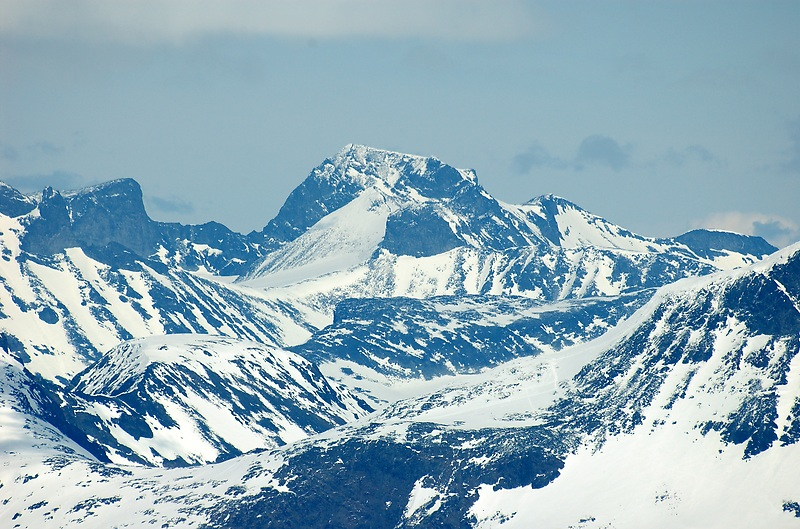
Galdhøpiggen seen from west, Norway's highest mountain

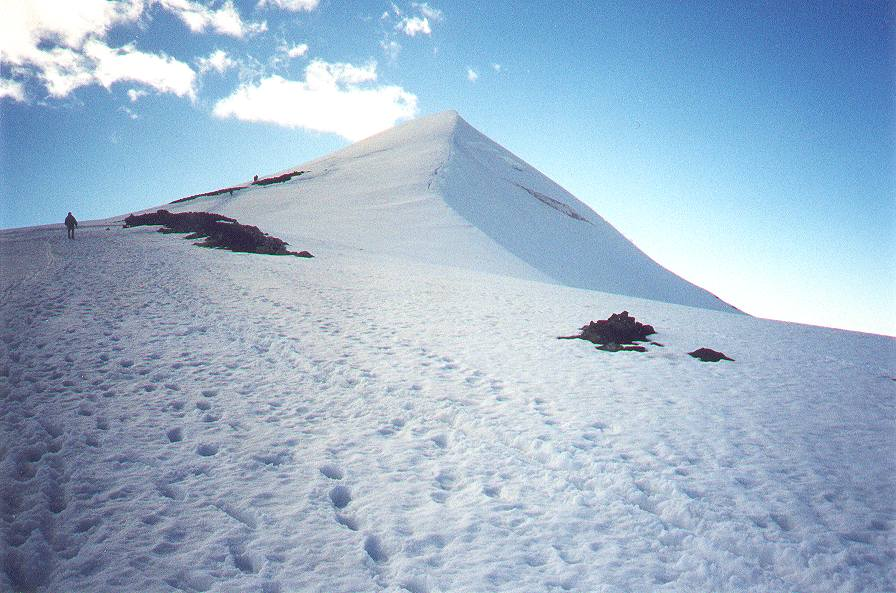
Glittertind

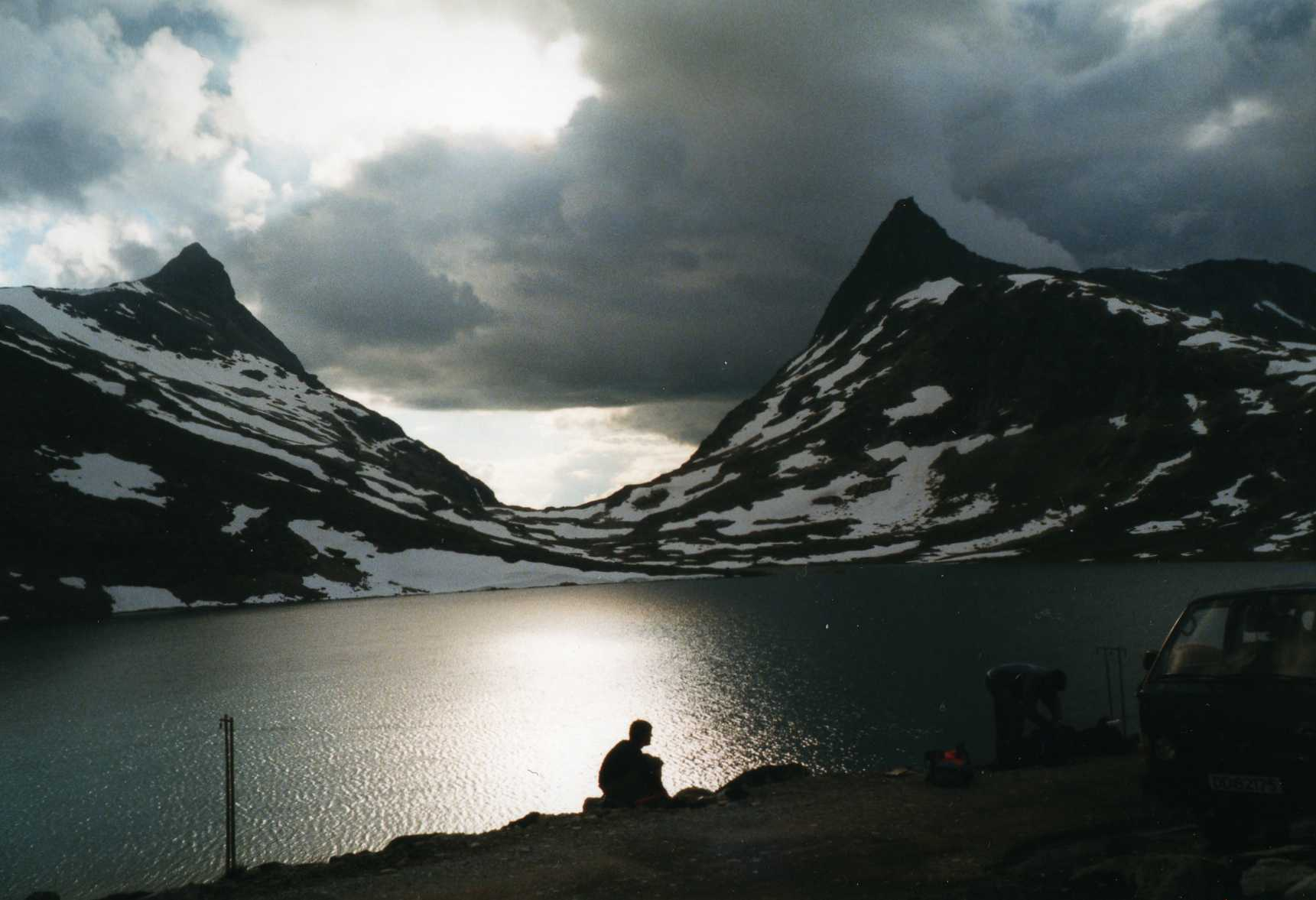
Falketind in Jotunheimen

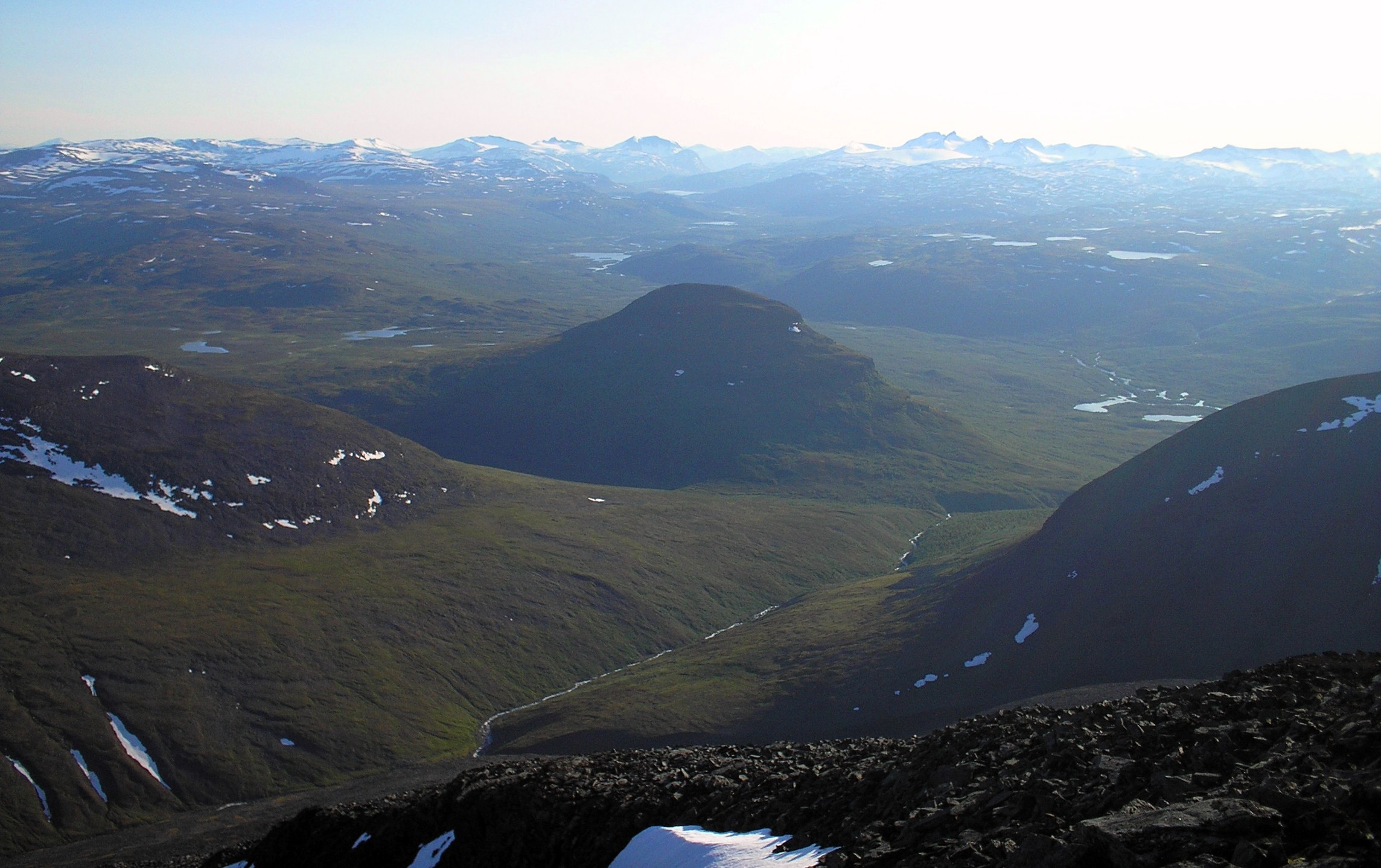
Landscape between Abisko National Park and Kebnekaise

=== Sweden ===
There are 12 peaks in Sweden that reach above 2,000 m high (6,600 ft), or 13 depending on how the peaks are defined. Eight of them are located in Sarek National Park and the neighbouring national park Stora Sjöfallet. The other four peaks are located in the further north region of Kebnekaise. All mountain names are in Sami but with the more common Swedish spelling of it.

1. 2,097 m (6,880 ft) Kebnekaise Nordtoppen (Lappland) – the highest fixed point in Sweden.
2. 2,095 m (6,873 ft) Kebnekaise (Lappland) – Note: Altitude includes the peak glacier.
3. 2,089 m (6,854 ft) Sarektjåkkå Stortoppen (Lappland)
4. 2,076 m (6,811 ft) Kaskasatjåkka (Lappland)
5. 2,056 m (6,745 ft) Sarektjåkkå Nordtoppen (Lappland)
6. 2,043 m (6,703 ft) Kaskasapakte (Lappland)
7. 2,023 m (6,637 ft) Sarektjåkkå Sydtoppen (Lappland)
8. 2,016 m (6,614 ft) Akka Stortoppen (Lappland)
9. 2,010 m (6,594 ft) Akka Nordvästtoppen (Lappland)
10. 2,010 m (6,594 ft) Sarektjåkkå Buchttoppen (Lappland)
11. 2,005 m (6,578 ft) Pårtetjåkka (Lappland)
12. 2,002 m (6,568 ft) Palkatjåkka (Lappland)

Other popular mountains for skiers, climbers and hikers in Sweden

- Sulitelma 1,860 m (6,102 ft) (Lappland)
- Helagsfjället 1,796 m (5,892 ft) (Härjedalen)
- Norra Storfjället 1,767 m (5,797 ft) (Lappland)
- Templet 1,728 m (5,669 ft) (Jämtland)
- Lillsylen 1,704 m (5,591 ft) (Jämtland)
- Åreskutan 1,420 m (4,659 ft) (Jämtland)
- Storvätteshågna 1,204 m (3,950 ft) (Dalarna)
- Nipfjället 1,191 m (3,907 ft) (Dalarna)
- Städjan 1,131 m (3,711 ft) (Dalarna)

=== Finland ===
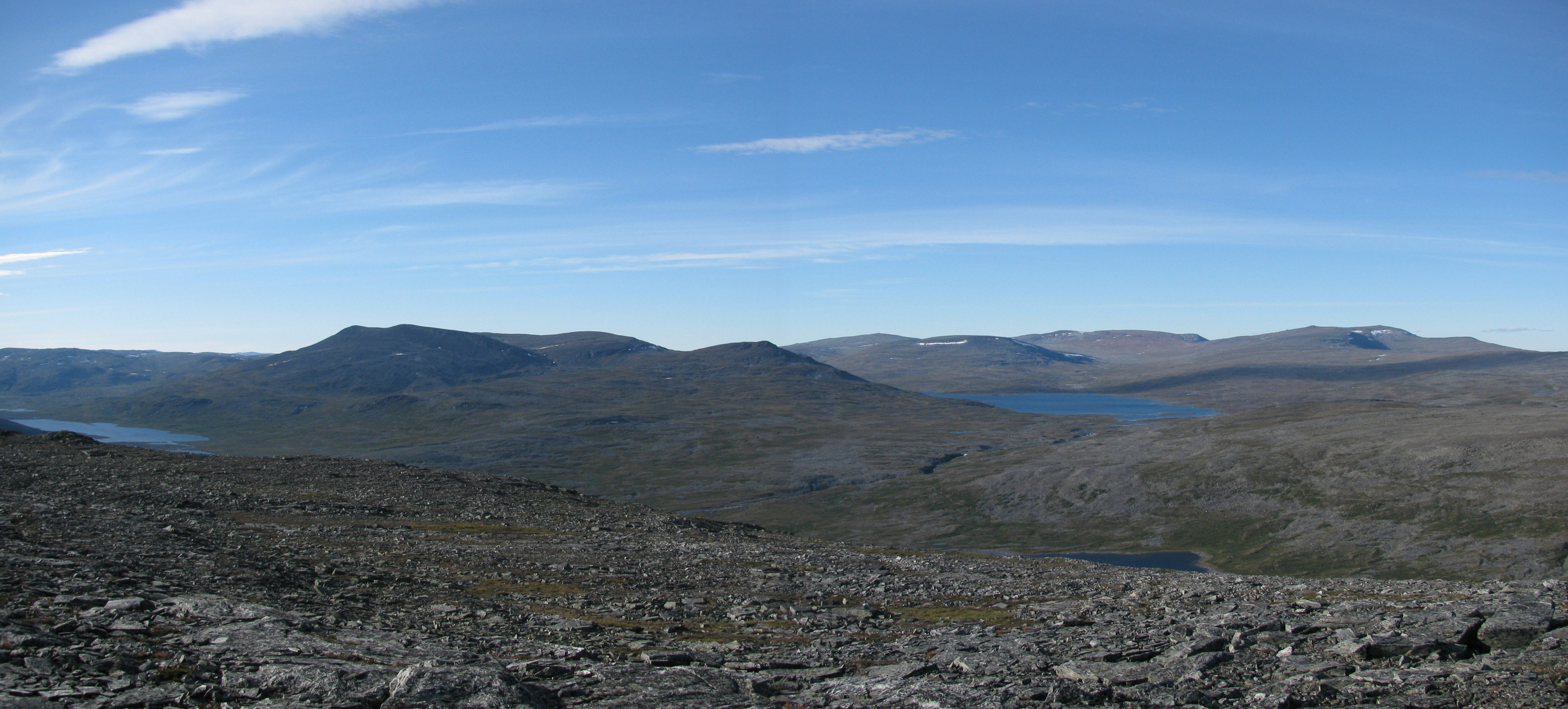
Landscape as seen from Meekonvaara (1,019 m; 3,343 ft) towards the highest fells

1. 1,324 m (4,344 ft) Halti (Lappi/Lapland and Norwegian Troms)
2. 1,317 m (4,321 ft) Ridnitsohkka (Lappi/Lapland)
3. 1,280 m (4,200 ft) Kiedditsohkka (Lappi/Lapland)
4. 1,240 m (4,068 ft) Kovddoskaisi (Lappi/Lapland)
5. 1,239 m (4,065 ft) Ruvdnaoaivi (Lappi/Lapland)
6. 1,180 m (3,871 ft) Loassonibba (Lappi/Lapland)
7. 1,150 m (3,773 ft) Urtasvaara (Lappi/Lapland)
8. 1,144 m (3,753 ft) Kahperusvaarat (Lappi/Lapland)
9. 1,130 m (3,707 ft) Aldorassa (Lappi/Lapland)
10. 1,100 m (3,608 ft) Kieddoaivi (Lappi/Lapland)

== See also ==
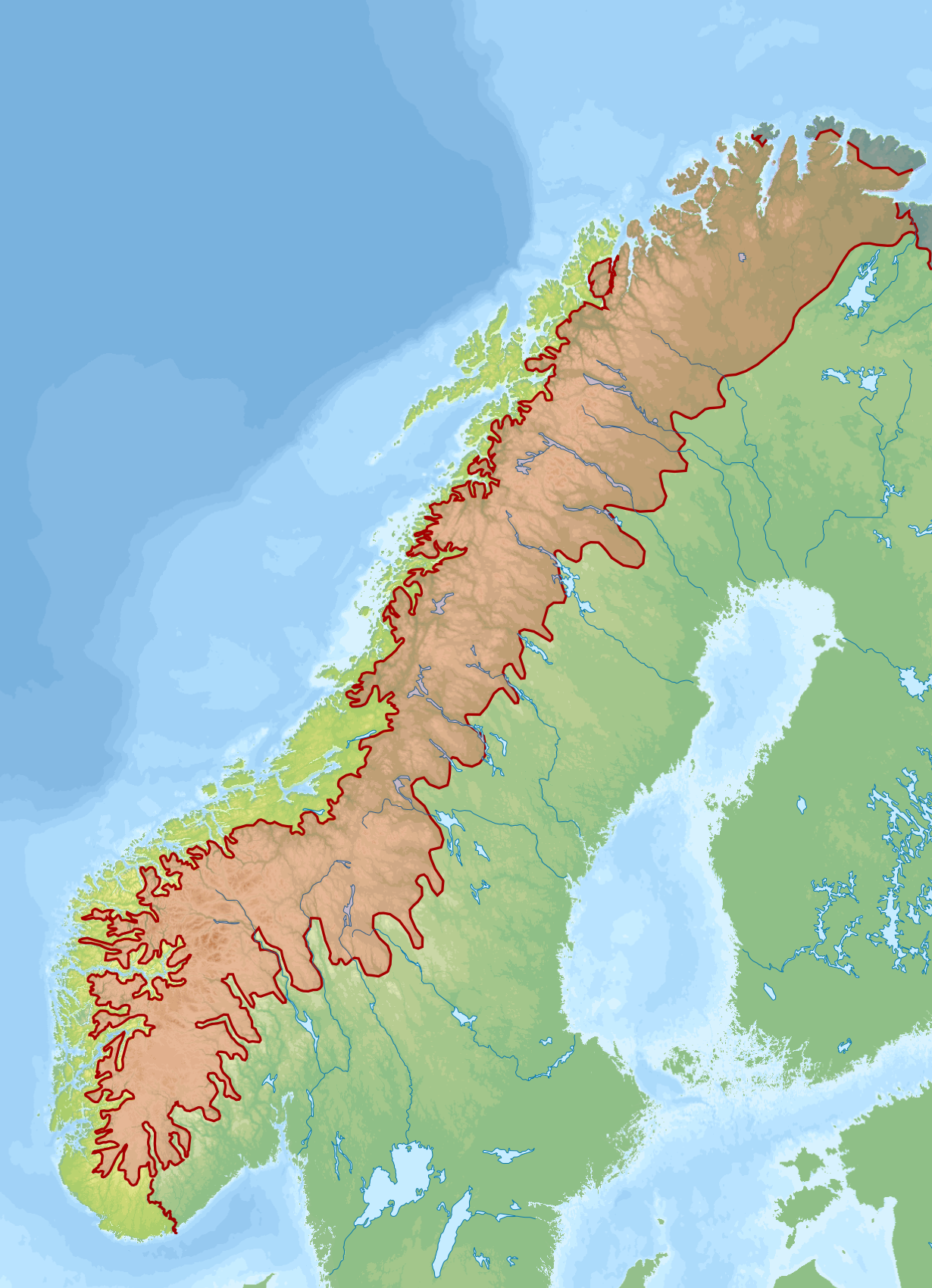
Scandinavian Mountains, an Alpine Biogeographic Region as defined by the European Environment Agency and corrected by the Norwegian Directorate for Nature Management: red = Alpine region, yellow = Atlantic region, green = Boreal region, blue = Arctic region

- Dovrefjell
- Jotunheimen
