= Sarektjåkkå =

Mountain in Sweden

Sarektjåhkkå
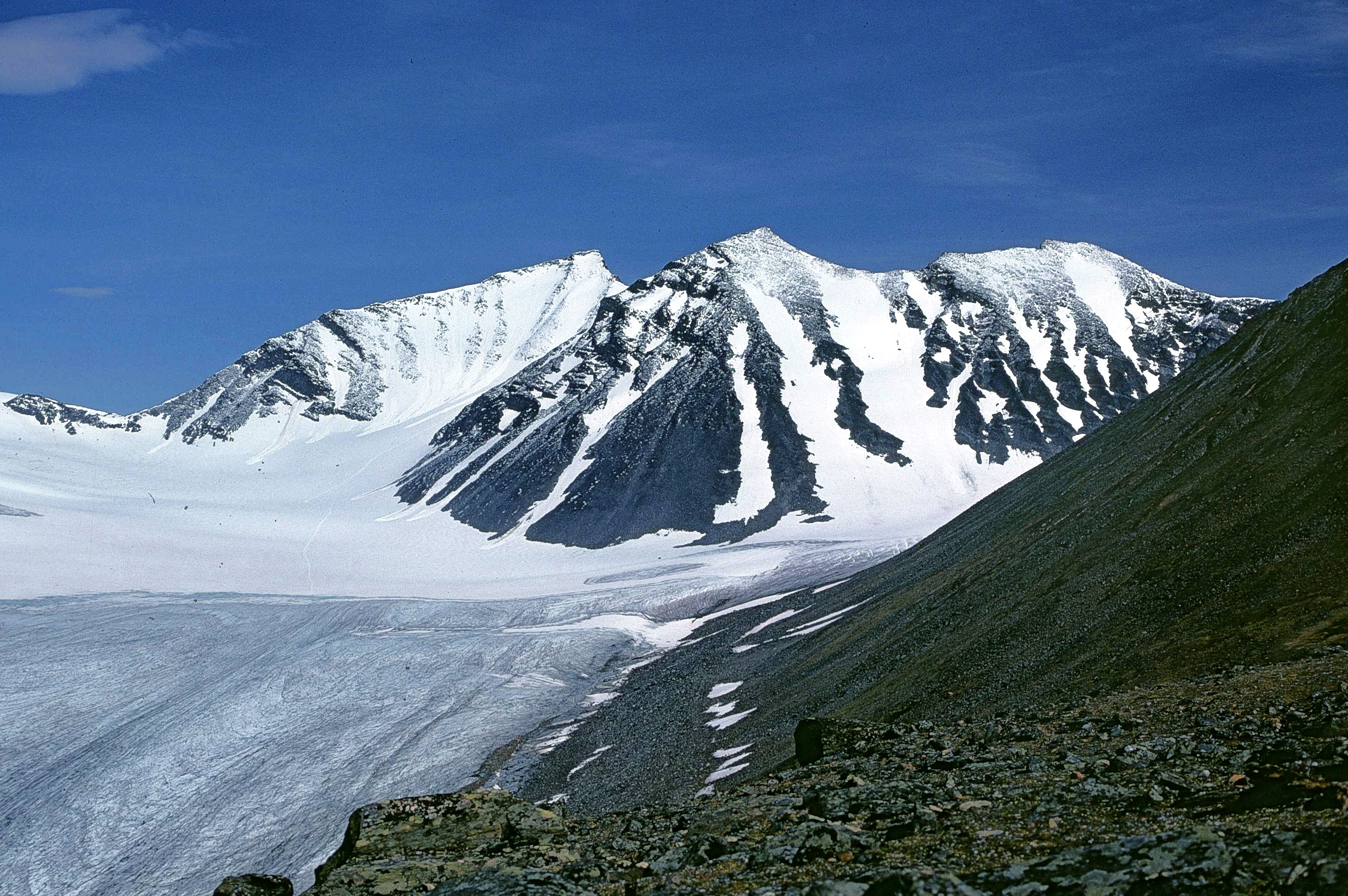
- Sarektjåhkkå, Stortoppen to the left and Sydtoppen in the middle

Highest point
- Elevation: 2,089 m (6,854 ft)
- Prominence: 1,519 m (4,984 ft)
- Isolation: 62 km (39 mi) to Kebnekaise
- Listing: Ultra
- Coordinates: 67°25′55″N 17°43′30″E

Geography
- Location within Sweden
- Location: Sweden
- Parent range: Scandinavian Mountains

Climbing
- Easiest route: Hike

Sarektjåkkå (Swedish: [ˈsɑ̌ːrɛkˌɕɔkːɔ]) is the second highest mountain in Sweden and the highest mountain in the Laponian area at 2,089 metres (6,854 ft) AMSL. However its mountain peak is the 3:rd highest mountain peak in Sweden, because the two highest peaks in Sweden belongs to the mountain Kebnekaise at 2,097 (North Summit) and 2090 meters (South Summit). The mountain is located close to the eastern border of Sarek National Park, about 23 kilometres (14 mi) southwest of Suorva.

== Climbing ==
Sarektjåkkå is not easily accessible by any nearby roads, so the approach normally takes a day or more of backcountry hiking.

Accessing the north summit, at 2,054 metres (6,739 ft) altitude, is a moderate but steep hike up. The actual summit (Stortoppen) is located about 600 metres (2,000 ft) southwest of the north summit via a ridge and is not as easy to reach, requiring exposed scrambling. An alternative route is to scale the summit from the south by merely steep hiking, but this requires crossing glaciers.

== See also ==
- List of European ultra-prominent peaks
