= Halti =

Fell at the Finnish–Norwegian border

- (the mountain peak)
- Location of the mountain

Highest point
- Elevation: 1,365 m (4,478 ft)
- Prominence: 510 m (1,670 ft)
- Coordinates: 69°19′22″N 21°16′44″E

Geography
- Location: Norway
- Parent range: Scandinavian Mountains

Climbing
- Easiest route: walk about 50 km (30 mi) from Kilpisjärvi in Finland or walk 5 km (3 mi) from Kåfjorddalen in Norway

Halti
- (the border point)
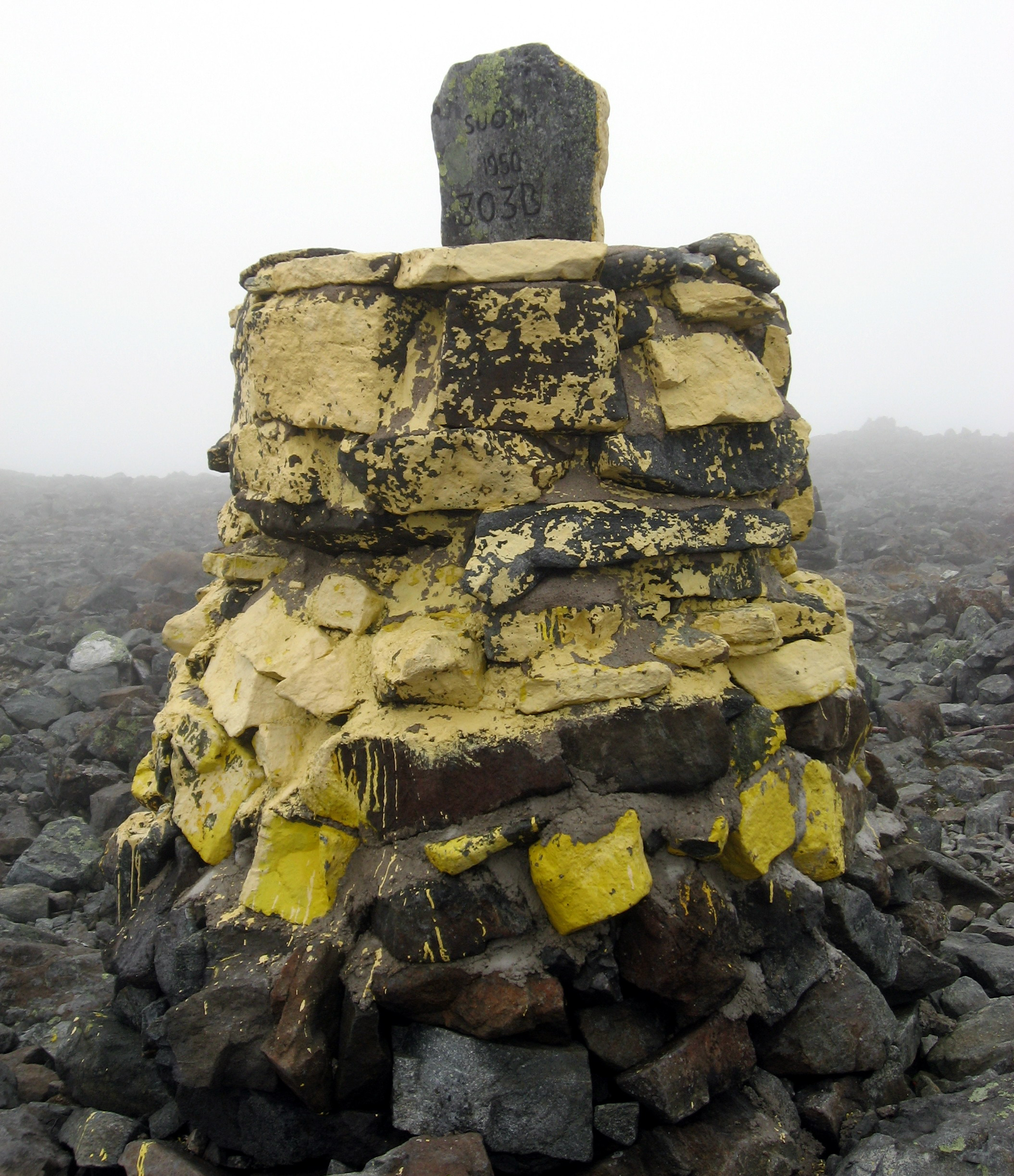
- The highest point of Finland, also a border marker

Highest point
- Elevation: 1,324 m (4,344 ft)
- Prominence: 0 m (0 ft)
- Listing: Highest in Finland
- Coordinates: 69°18′29″N 21°15′47″E

Geography
- Location: Norway and Finland

Climbing
- Easiest route: walk about 50 km (31 mi) from Kilpisjärvi in Finland or walk 6 km (3.7 mi) from Kåfjorddalen in Norway

Halti (Finnish: Halti, rarely Haltiatunturi, Northern Sami: Háldičohkka, Swedish: Haldefjäll) is a fell at the border between Norway and Finland. The peak (elevation 1,365 m (4,478 ft)) of the fell, called Ráisduottarháldi, is in Norway, on the border Nordreisa Municipality and Gáivuotna Municipality (Kåfjord), about one kilometre (5/8 mile) north of the border with Finland. The highest point of the fell on the Finnish side is at 1,324 m (4,344 ft) above sea level, and thus the highest point in the country. The Finnish side of Halti belongs to the municipality of Enontekiö in the province of Lapland.

The highest point in Finland is on a spur of Ráisduottarháldi at 1,324 m (4,344 ft) known as Hálditšohkka at the border of Norway. The peak proper is not in Finland; the border marker is on a slope. The highest peak of a mountain that is entirely in Finland is Ridnitšohkka, at 1,316 m (4,318 ft) and a few kilometers from Halti.

The reason for the border being the way it is can be traced to a Swedish-Danish border treaty in 1734, when Norway belonged to Denmark and Finland was part of Sweden. The treaty specifies the border only by some of its biggest natural features like mountains. Thus, international boundary commissions would walk the border and place border markers where it was convenient. The actual border was then agreed to lie on a straight line between these markers, as was the usual practice at the time.

A 55 km (34 mi) trekking path leads from Saana, Kilpisjärvi to Halti. An easier route goes from a local road (open in summer only) going from Birtavarre in Norway, around 6 km (3 1/2 mi) hiking to the highest point in Finland. The route is rocky and not really adapted to hiking.

== Proposed border change ==
In 2015, a group of Norwegians began a campaign to give the peak of Hálditšohkka to Finland for its centenary in 2017 by moving the border between the two countries by 200 m (660 ft). The idea gained substantial public support in both countries, and in July 2016 it was reported that the Prime Minister of Norway, Erna Solberg was seriously considering ceding the peak. Norway ultimately chose not to move the border, citing the Norwegian constitution's definition of the country as an "indivisible and inalienable" realm.

== See also ==
- Scandinavian Mountains
- Extreme points of Finland
- List of highest points of European countries
- Ernst Thälmann Island, gifted symbolically by Cuba to East Germany in 1972.
