= E1 European long distance path =

Walking path in Europe

E1 European long-distance path
- Length: 7,114 kilometres (4,420 mi)
- Location: Europe
- Designation: European long-distance paths
- Trailheads: Nordkapp, Norway; Capo Passero, Italy
- Use: Hiking, backpacking
- Highest point: St. Gotthard Pass, Canton of Ticino, Switzerland, 2,106 m (6,909 ft)
- Lowest point: Sea Level, Nordkapp, Norway, 0 m (0 ft)
- Difficulty: Easy to strenuous
- Months: Any
- Website: European Ramblers Association E1

Trail map
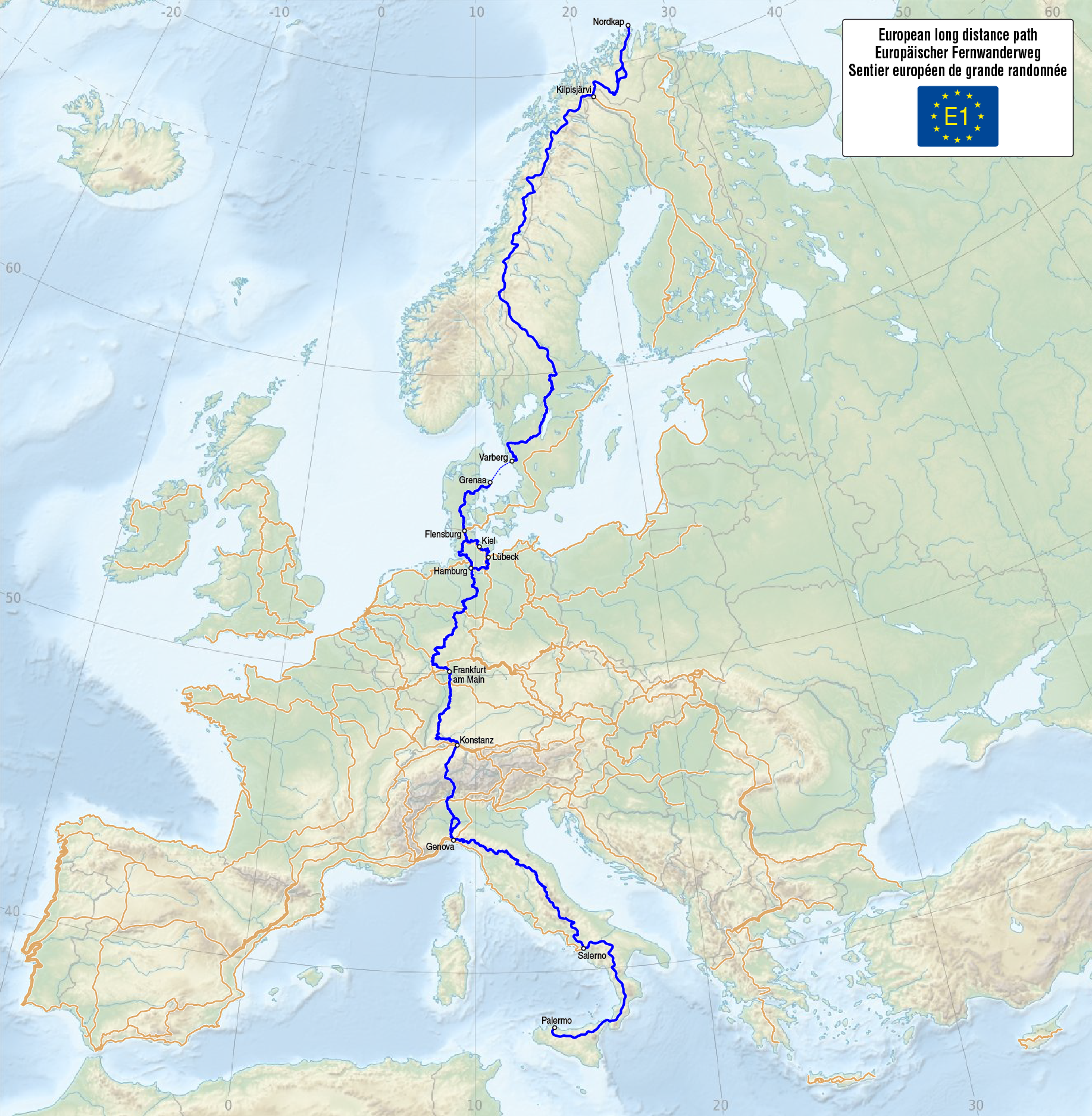
- E1 European long-distance path

The E1 European long-distance path, or just E1 path, is one of the European long-distance paths designated by the European Ramblers' Association. It has a total length of some 7,000 kilometres (4,300 mi). It begins in Norway at the North Cape (Norwegian: Nordkapp) in Nordkapp Municipality, it progresses to the south and crosses the Kattegat between Sweden and Denmark by ferry. It passes through Denmark, Germany, and Switzerland to finish at Capo Passero, Italy. This path was extended southwards to Sicily, in Italy, in 2018.

Specific E1 waymarks are only seen in some locations such as at border crossings or at intersections with other paths; otherwise, the signs and markings of the local routes which make up the E1 are used. The path is described here in a north to south direction, although it is waymarked in both directions.

== Norway ==
In 2010 and 2011, the Norwegian Trekking Association created a marked hiking trail from Nordkapp to Kautokeino. Also following the Nordkalottruta and Grensesømmen, this extended the E1 all the way to the North Cape. The Nordkalottruta (Kautokeino-Treriksrøysa-Abisko-Sulitjelma) and Grensesømmen (Sulitjelma-Røssvatnet-Børgefjell-Gressåmoen-Sylan-Grövelsjön) cross the Norwegian-Finnish and Norwegian-Swedish border several times. The route between Nordkapp and Grövelsjön does in part go in very remote areas with very few shelters and very little service available. Parts of the path are unmarked, meaning hikers need to find their own route.

=== Norwegian kick-off ===
On 4 June 2013, Innovasjon Norge and Norwegian Trekking Association marked the Norwegian part of the path officially opened. The path stretches 2,105 kilometres (1,308 mi), and has 60,000 waymarks on either cairns or tree stems all the way, except through Børgefjell National Park; regulations for Børgefjell National Park prohibits waymarks. The Børgefjell section is only marked on maps. This is also valid for the next section; from the southern tip of Børgefjell National Park to Sætertjønnhytta in Steinkjer Municipality, there are no waymarks by the desire of the Sami people and other considerations.

=== Route ===
==== Parts marked with cairns ====
Nordkapp → North Cape Tunnel

North Cape Tunnel → Stabbursdalen National Park

Stabbursdalen National Park → Masi

Masi → Kautokeino

Kautokeino → Reisa National Park

Reisa National Park → Käsivarsi Wilderness Area (Finland)

Käsivarsi Wilderness Area (Finland) → Kilpisjärvi (Finland)

Kilpisjärvi (Finland) → Malla Strict Nature Reserve (Finland)

Malla Strict Nature Reserve (Finland) → Goldahytta near Treriksrøysa (Sweden, Finland, Norway)

Goldahytta near Treriksrøysa (Sweden, Finland, Norway) → Øvre Dividal National Park

Øvre Dividal National Park → Altevatnet

Altevatnet → Torneträsk (Sweden)

Torneträsk (Sweden) → Narvikfjellene

Narvikfjellene → Tysfjorden

Tysfjorden → Stora Sjöfallet National Park (Sweden)

Stora Sjöfallet National Park (Sweden) → Padjelanta National Park (Sweden)

Padjelanta National Park (Sweden) → Junkerdal National Park

Junkerdal National Park → Saltfjellet–Svartisen National Park

Saltfjellet–Svartisen National Park → Okstindan

Okstindan → Børgefjell National Park

==== Parts only marked on the map ====
The path goes through Børgefjell National Park and then, from the southern tip of Børgefjell National Park in Røyrvik Municipality, Trøndelag county, continues through Røyrvik, over Steinfjellet in Namsskogan Municipality and back into Røyrvik. The path continues along Tunnsjøen to Skorovatn in Namsskogan again, over Gruvefjellet to Midtre Nesåvatnet, and then under Nesåpiggen in Røyrvik again. Then, it continues to Skjelbredtunet in Lierne Municipality and through Blåfjella–Skjækerfjella National Park to lake Holderen in Snåsa Municipality. It continues near Gaundalen airport over Skjækerfjella to Sætertjønnhytta in Steinkjer Municipality by the lake Skæhkerenjaevrie, close to the geographical centre of Norway. In these areas, there are no waymarks by wish of Sami people and other considerations.

== Sweden ==
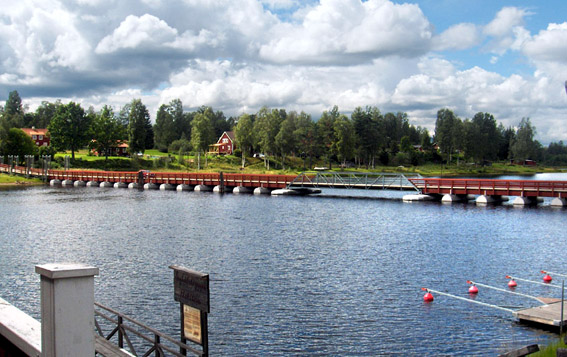
Österdalälven river near Gagnef

Svenska Turistföreningen is the organisation responsible for this section of the route.

=== Route ===
The path starts at Grövelsjön (Lake Grövel), which lies near the Norwegian-Swedish border near Idre. It uses a series of connecting established paths down to Halmstad, a city on the coast south of Gothenburg, from where the ferry to Denmark sails.

From its start, it follows Vasaloppsleden, Siljansleden, the southern part of the Malingsbo-Kloten Rundan, Bergslagsleden, Västra Vätterleden along the western edge of lake Vättern, a short part of Södra Vätterleden at Ulricehamn and a connecting trail to Sjuhäradsleden, then Knalleleden, Vildmarksleden and Bohusleden to Gothenburg and Hallandsleden to Halmstad.

Total length of the path in Sweden: approximately 1,200 kilometres (750 mi).

From the start at Grövelsjön, other established walking paths go further north, for example reaching Hemavan, from which the well-known Kungsleden goes to Abisko in the far north of Sweden.

=== Practical ===
The route consists mostly of narrow footpaths running through the forested hills of middle Sweden and avoids most population centers. There are not many shops along the route so it may be necessary to plan or go off-route for supplies. The paths are printed on Swedish topographic maps, so special maps or guidebooks are not necessary. Wild camping in Sweden is allowed. Alternatively, there are many vindskydd (a type of lean-to) along the route. These are simple three-sided log cabins with the open side facing a campfire. They are often in idyllic places and are free to use.

== Denmark ==
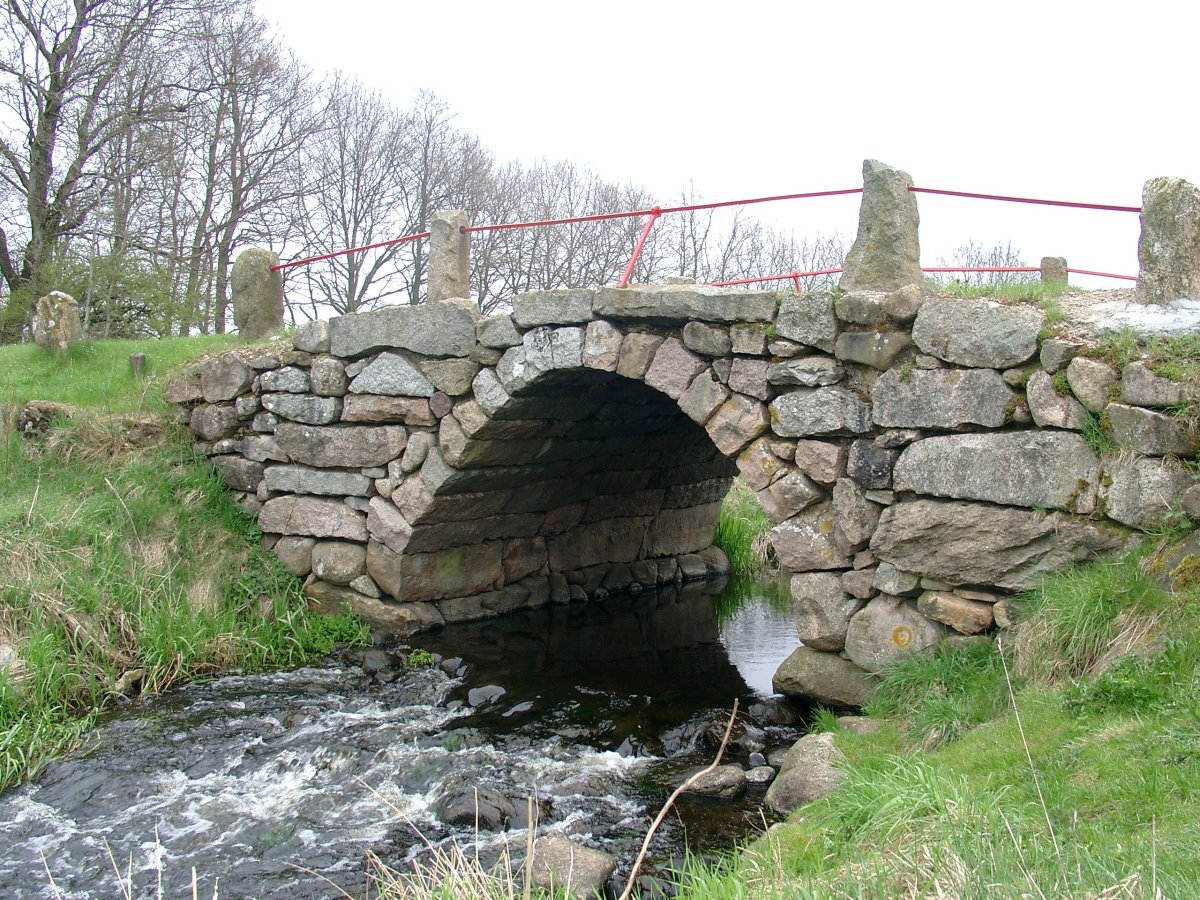
Povl's Bridge from 1744

Dansk Vandrelaug is the organisation responsible for this section of the route.

=== Route ===
The ferry from Halmstad in Sweden arrives in Grenå. The link from Grenå to Vrads Sande on the Hærvej was inaugurated in 2006. The first part of this new stage is the Mols route to Århus. Then it uses the Århus – Silkeborg route via Skanderborg to Virklund and from Virklund to Vrads on the Horsens Silkeborg naturstien. At Vrads, it connects to the historic Hærvej, which continues south to the German border. It connects to the European walking route E6 near Padborg. From Bov a part of the Gendarmstien is used to link the Hærvejen to the German Ochsenweg. The border is crossed between Kruså and Kupfermühle.

The total length in Denmark is 378 kilometres (235 mi).

=== Practical ===
Camping in the wild is not allowed in Denmark. However, there are primitive campsites (Danish: lejrplads) along the route, which commonly have room to pitch a few tents, a water tap or pump, and a simple toilet, and they are often free to use. The route is considered easy; it also passes through larger towns, so other forms of accommodation and supplies are accessible.

== Germany ==
In Germany, regional walking organisations are responsible for waymarking and maintaining the E1 in their area, with the Deutsche Wanderverband as the umbrella organisation.

The total length in Germany is 1,829.5 kilometres (1,136.8 mi).

=== Schleswig-Holstein and Hamburg ===
Wanderverband Norddeutschland is the organisation responsible for this section of the route.

This section of the E1 route is the same as for the E6 route. The path crosses the border at Kupfermühle near Flensburg and leads through the towns of Flensburg and Schleswig. It touches the Naturpark Hüttener Berge and runs parallel to the coast of the Baltic Sea until it reaches the city of Kiel. After Kiel, it passes through the towns of Preetz, Plön, Malente, Eutin and Neustadt on its way to Lübeck. It continues via Ratzeburg and Mölln to Güster – here the path of the E1 branches away from the E6. In Hamburg, the route crosses the river Elbe.

The Schlei – Eider – Elbe Wanderweg is known as the west alternative (Westvariant) of the E1 between Flensburg and Hamburg. It runs parallel to the North Sea coast and the Elbe instead of the Baltic.

Detailed route: Kupfermühle – Sankelmark – Schleswig – Ascheffel – Aschau – Strande – Kiel – Preetz – Niederkleveez – Schönwalde am Bungsberg – Klingberg – Kreutzkamp – Krummesee – Mölln – Güster – Witzhave – Hamburg.

=== Lower Saxony ===
Hamburg – Neugraben-Fischbek – Harburg Hills – Buchholz in der Nordheide – Undeloh – Soltau – Müden – Celle – Fuhrberg – Otternhagen – Haste – Springe – Hameln – Bösingfeld

Length of this section: 339 kilometres (211 mi).

=== North Rhine-Westphalia ===
Bösingfeld – Lemgo – Horn-Bad Meinberg – Herbrahmwald – Blankerode – Marsberg – Wirminghausen – Schwalefeld – Altastenburg – Bad Berleburg – Bad Laasphe – Lahnhof – Siegen – Herdorf

Length of this section: 275 kilometres (171 mi).

=== Rhineland-Palatinate (Rheinland-Pfalz) ===
Herdorf – Fuchskaute – Unnau – Selters – Montabaur – Nassau – Balduinstein – Michelbach – Idstein

Length of this section: 169 kilometres (105 mi).

=== Hessen ===
Idstein – Oberursel – Frankfurt-Sachsenhausen – Dreieichenhain – Ober-Ramstadt – Bensheim – Nieder-Liebersbach – Heidelberg

Length of this section: 166.5 kilometres (103.5 mi).

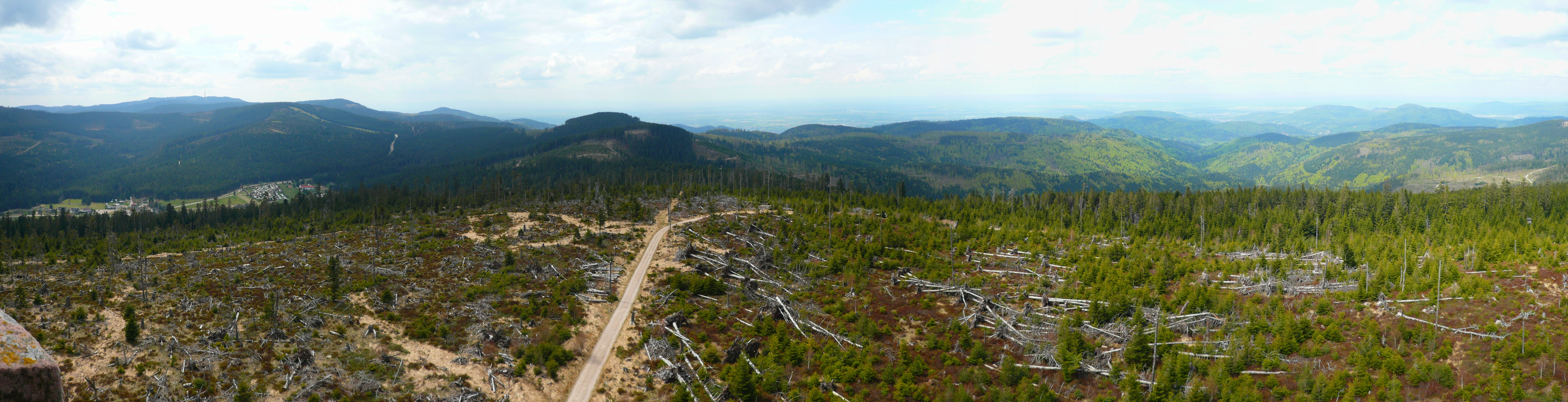
View from Badener Höhe

=== Baden-Württemberg ===
The E1 in the Black Forest follows pre-existing long-distance paths. It follows the Westweg from the town of Heidelberg on to Schlierbach – Rauenberg – Odenheim – Bretten – Pforzheim – Dobel – Forbach via Kaiser Wilhelm-Turm (a lookout tower) – Badener Höhe – the Mummelsee – Hausach – the Titisee – the peak of the Feldberg – the Schluchsee – Kappel. From there, it follows the Freiburg-Lake Constance Black Forest Trail to Boll, Riedöschingen, Engen, Singen, Langenrain and Konstanz.

Length of this section: 464 kilometres (288 mi).

== Switzerland ==
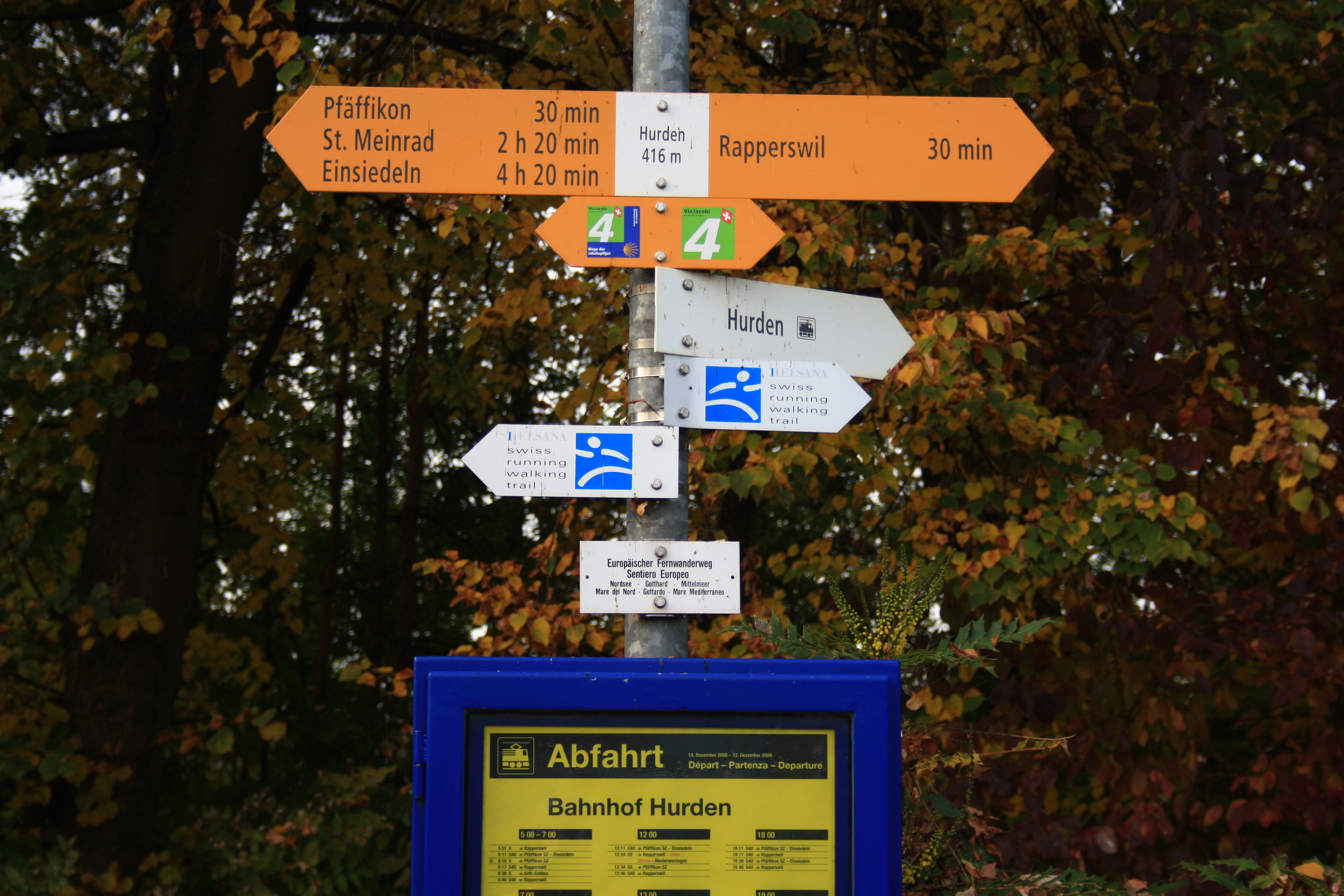
Hiking sign at Hurden

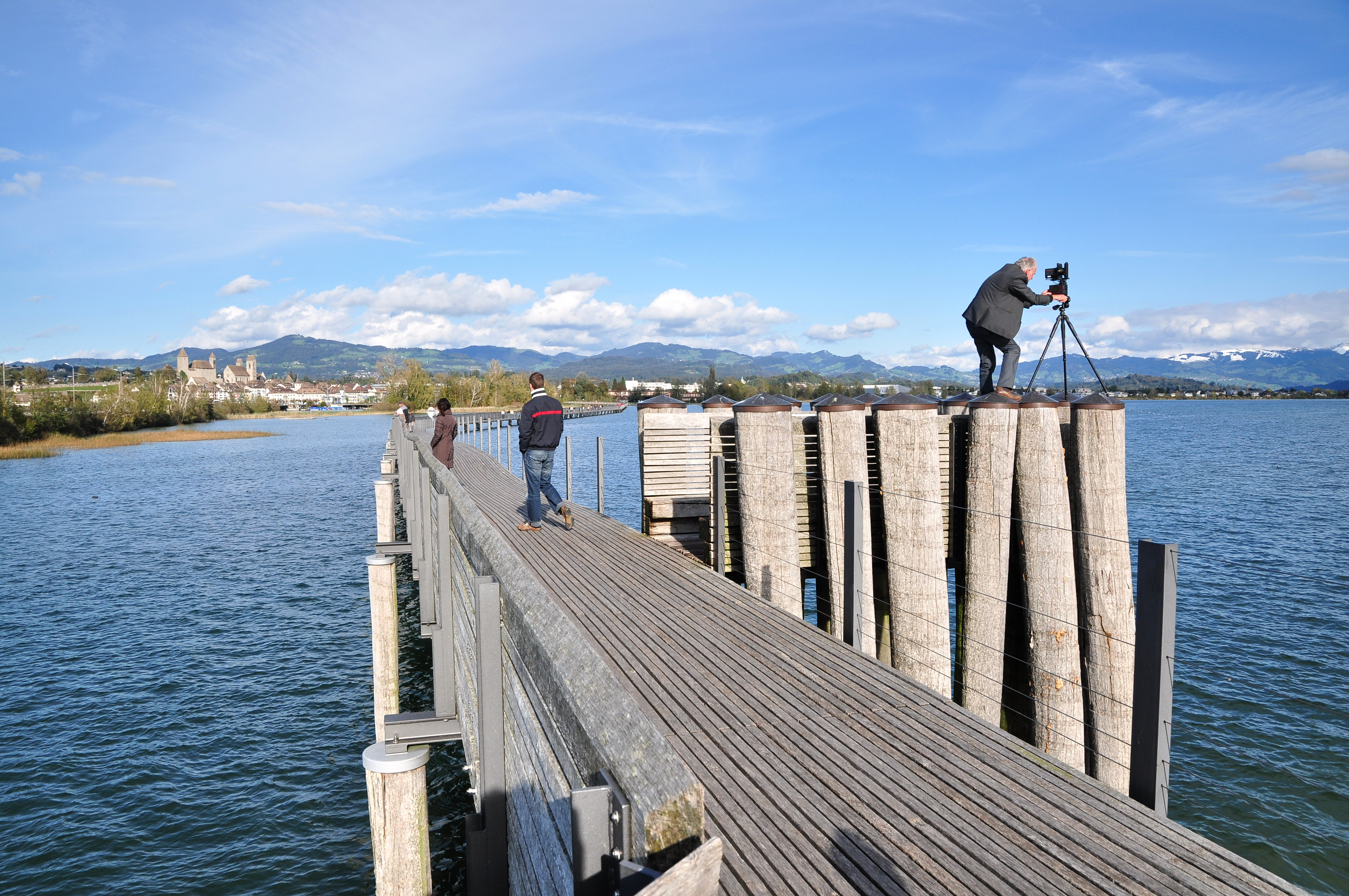
Holzbrücke Rapperswil-Hurden (Way of St. James) between Rapperswil and Hurden

Schweizer Wanderwege is the organisation responsible for this section of the route.

=== Route ===
Switzerland has a dense network of walking path nodes with signposted junctions. The E1 is only rarely separately waymarked on these signposts, but the national routes which the E1 follows are generally marked. The route of the E1 leads from Konstanz to Wattwil, and then follows the Via Jacobi (part of the Way of St. James) to reach Lake Lucerne at Brunnen. From Brunnen, it follows the shore of the lake to Flüelen on the Swiss Path. From Flüelen to the Italian border, the Trans-Swiss Trail is used, waymarked as Fernwanderweg 2. The path then climbs over the St. Gotthard Pass, the highest point of the path at 2,106 metres (6,909 ft). After following the Strada alta Leventina through Ticino, the E1 reaches the border at Porto Ceresio, Italy.

The total length of the route in Switzerland is 348 kilometres (216 mi).

== Italy ==
Federazione Italiana Escursionismo is the organisation responsible for this section of the route.

The route starts at Porto Ceresio, continuing to Lake Maggiore into the Ligurian Mountains (there is a spur to the Mediterranean at Genova), then to Passo della Bochetta. It then goes through the eastern part of the Ligurian Mountains (Alta Via dei Monti Liguri) to Passo dei Due Santi. It continues along the Apennine ridge through Tuscany (Grande Escursione Appenninica) to Bocca Trabaria, then along the Apennine ridge through Umbria to Castelluccio. The route goes through mountains along the Abruzzo/Lazio border, passing through Simbruini, Ernici, and the Abruzzo, Lazio and Molise National Park to the Lazio/Molise border at Scapoli. The last leg continues through Campania, Basilicata, Calabria and Sicily, ending in Capo Passero. This final section has not yet been completed as of 2023 and is therefore not continuous.

The total length of the route in Italy is over 2,000 kilometres (1,200 mi); its exact length is unclear.
