= Nordkalottruta =

Scandinavian walking path

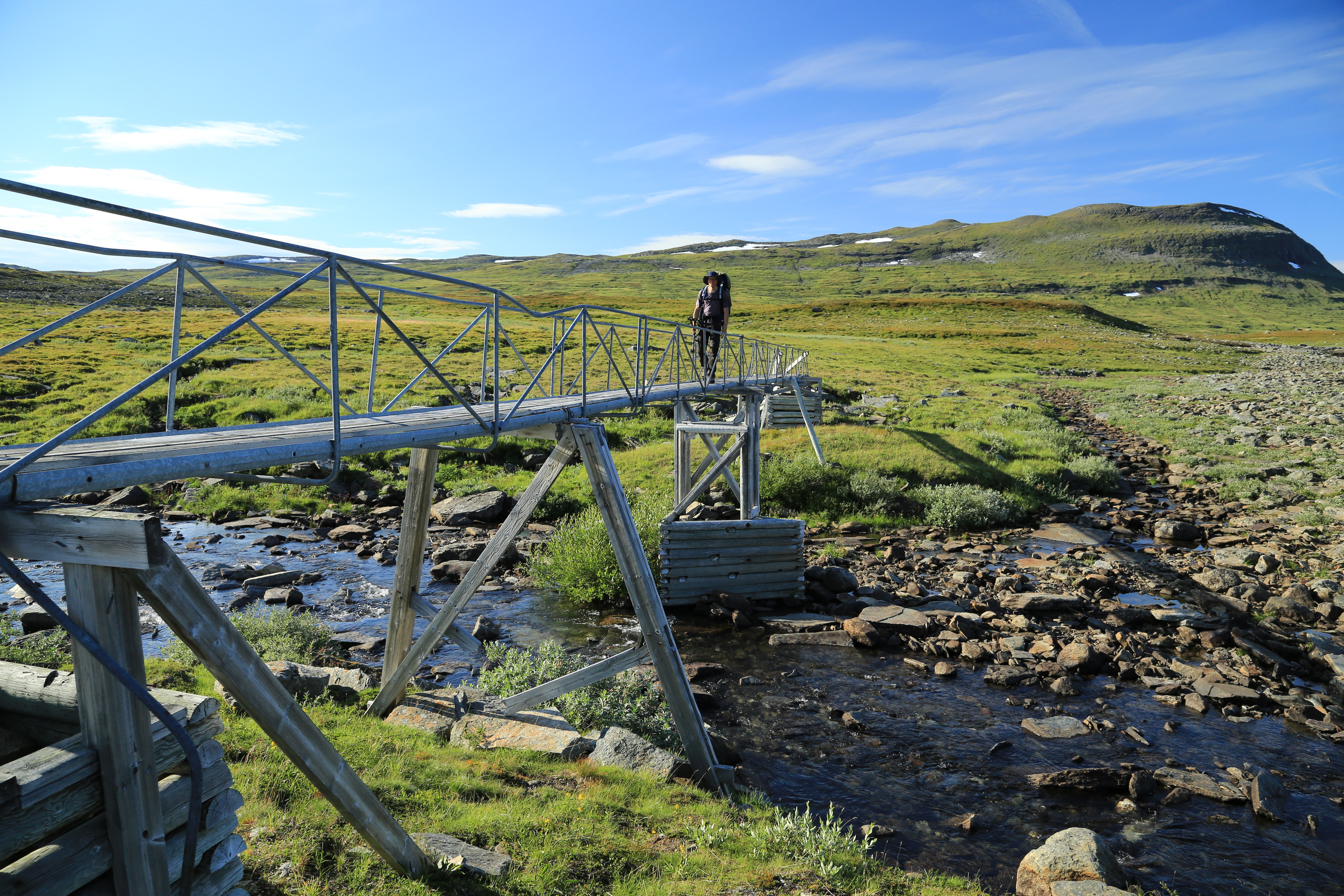
- Nordkalottleden in Sweden, near Akkajaure.
- Length: 800 km (500 mi)
- Location: Norway, Finland, Sweden
- Trailheads: Kautokeino/Sulitjelma/Kvikkjokk
- Use: Hiking

Nordkalottruta or Arctic Trail (also: Kalottireitti (Finnish); Nordkalottleden (Swedish)) is a marked hiking trail in the Arctic region of the Nordic countries. It has a total length of 800 km (500 mi) and lies along the border of Norway, Sweden and Finland. It begins at Kautokeino (located in Finnmark, Northern Norway) and 380 km (240 mi) of the trail lies in Norway, 350 km (220 mi) in Sweden and 70 km (43 mi) in Finland. The trail crosses international borders 15 times and ends in the south in Sulitjelma (Norway) or alternately Kvikkjokk (Sweden).

The trail was originally planned in 1977. It passes through Øvre Dividal National Park, Reisa National Park, Abisko National Park and Padjelanta National Park as well as the Sulitjelmafjellet and Narvikfjell regions. It has more recently become a section of the E1 Path.

== Points along the trail ==
Huts have been constructed along the trail. Almost all of the huts in Norway are operated by the DNT. Many in Sweden are operated by the STF and those in Finland by Finnish Forest Administration. For a small fee (in some huts for free), it is possible to stay in the hut and use the facilities. Some huts are fully staffed and serve food, while most are self-service (some of these require getting the DNT key). A few may require reservations in advance. Supplies can be bought in some of them. Because Norway, Sweden and Finland all have laws establishing freedom to roam, it is also possible to camp elsewhere along the trail, legally and for free. Some emergency shelters can also be found on the route.

The huts along the Nordkalottruta, between Kautokeino and Sulitjelma, include:

- Čunovuohppi (Norway)
- Reisavannhytta (NO) 69°12′47″N 22°27′50″E
- Nedrefosshytta (NO)
- Saraelv (NO) 69°27′20″N 21°31′59″E
- Somashytta (NO)
- Kopmajoki (Finland)
- Pitsusjärvi (FI)
- Meekonjärvi (FI) 69°9′36″N 21°20′58″E
- Kuonjarjoki (FI)
- Saarijärvi (FI)
- Kilpisjärven Retkeilykeskus (FI)
- Goldahytta (NO)
- Gappohytta (NO)
- Rostahytta (NO)
- Dærtahytta (NO)
- Dividalshytta (NO)
- Vuomahytta (NO)
- Gaskashytta (NO)
- Altevasshytta (NO)
- Lappjordhytta (NO)
- Pålnostugan (Sweden)
- Abisko Turiststation (SE)
- Abiskojaurestugan (SE)
- Unna Allakas (SE)
- Čunojávrihytta (NO)
- Cáihnavággihytta (NO)
- Gautelishytta (NO)
- Skoaddejavrehytta (NO)
- Sitashytta (NO)
- Paurohytta (NO)
- Røysvatn (NO)
- Vaisaluokta (SE)
- Kutjaure Mountain cabin (SE)
- Låddejåkkåstugan (SE)
- Arasluoktastugorna (SE)
- Staloluokta (SE)
- Staddajåhkå (SE)
- Sårjåsjaure Mountain cabin (SE)
- Sorjushytta (NO)

The huts along the alternate segment to Kvikkjokk are:

- Staddajåhkå (SE)
- Pieskehaure Mountain cabin (SE)
- Vaimok Mountain cabin (SE)
- Tarrekaise Mountain cabin (SE)
- Njunjes Mountain cabin (SE)
- Kvikkjokk Mountain station (SE)

Other points along the trail, such as towns and landmarks, include:

- Kautokeino (NO)
- Pitsusköngäs (FI) - a waterfall
- Kilpisjärvi (FI) - a village
- Malla Strict Nature Reserve (FI)
- Innset (NO)
- Abisko (SE)
- Skjomdalen (NO)
- Nikkaluokta (SE)
- Ritsem (SE)
- Sulitjelma (NO)
- Kvikkjokk (SE)
- Treriksröset (corner of NO, SE, and FI)

== Gallery ==
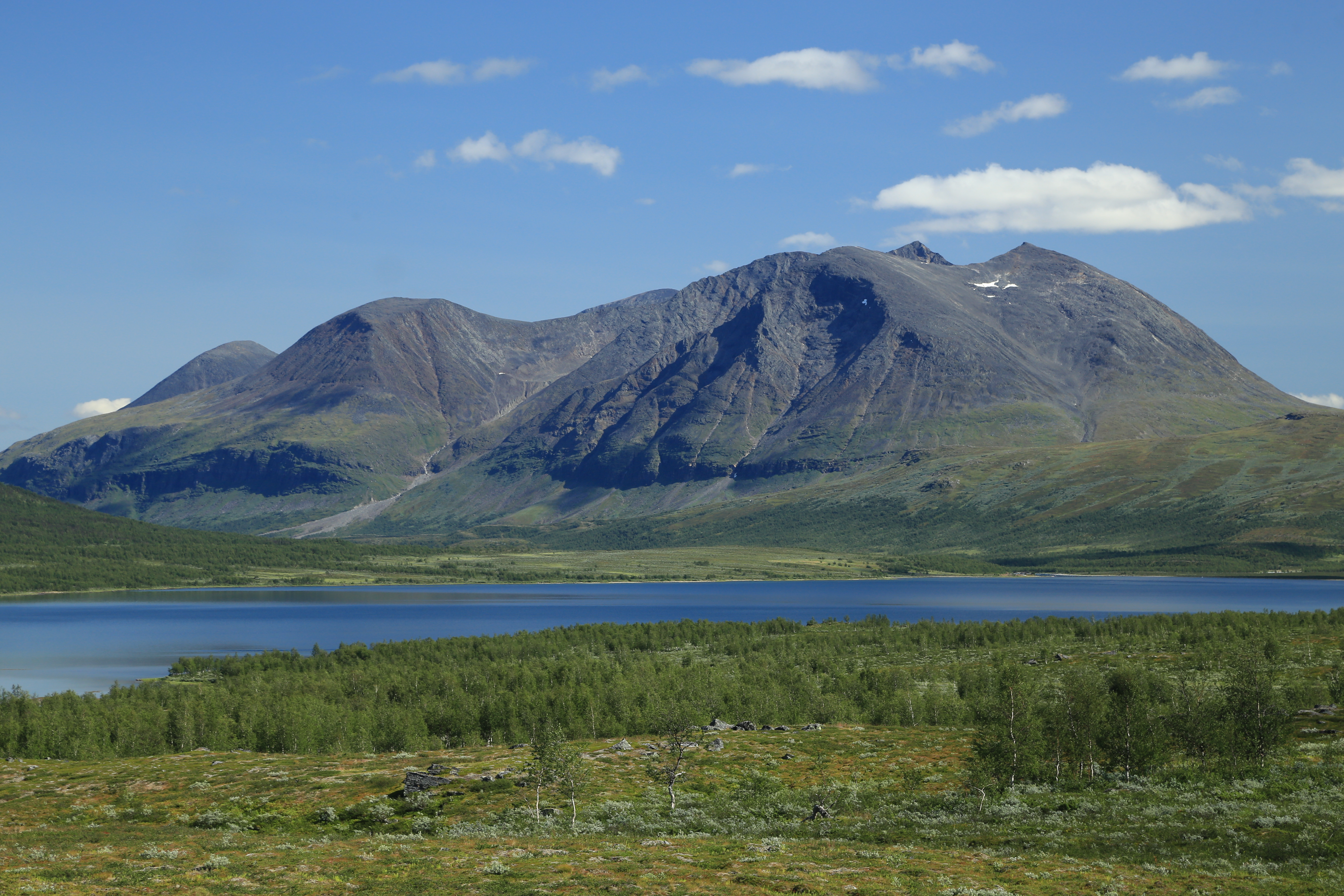

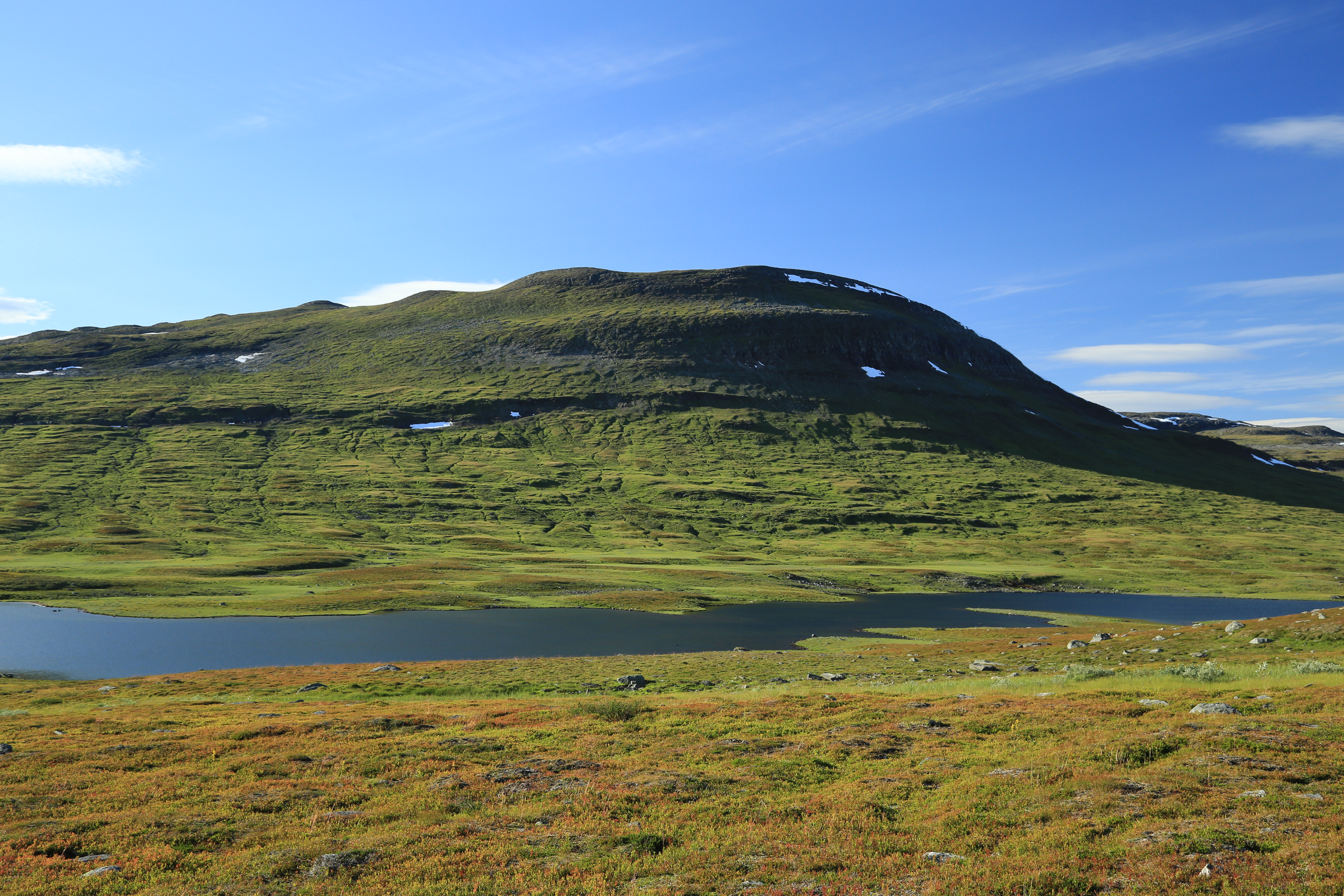

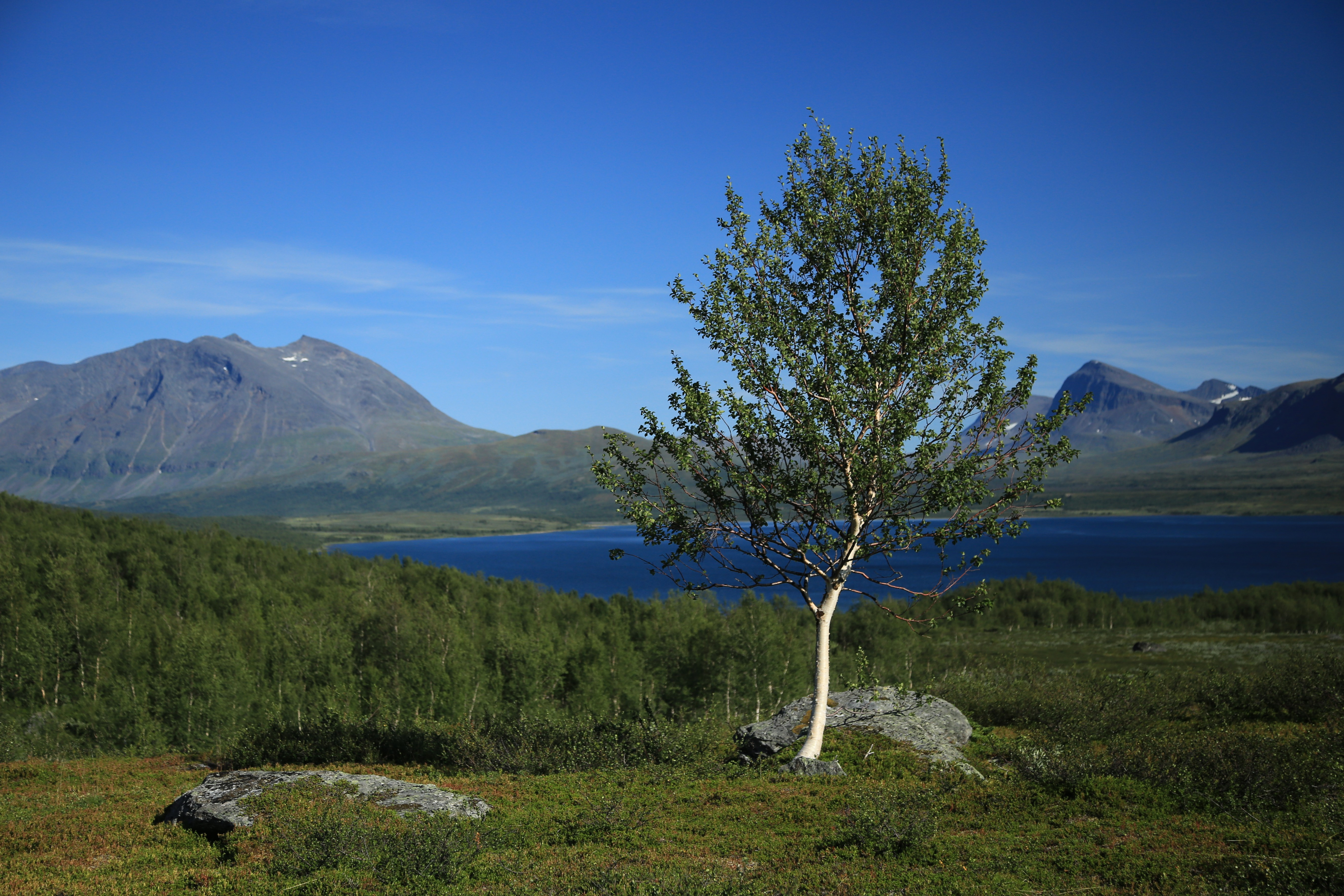

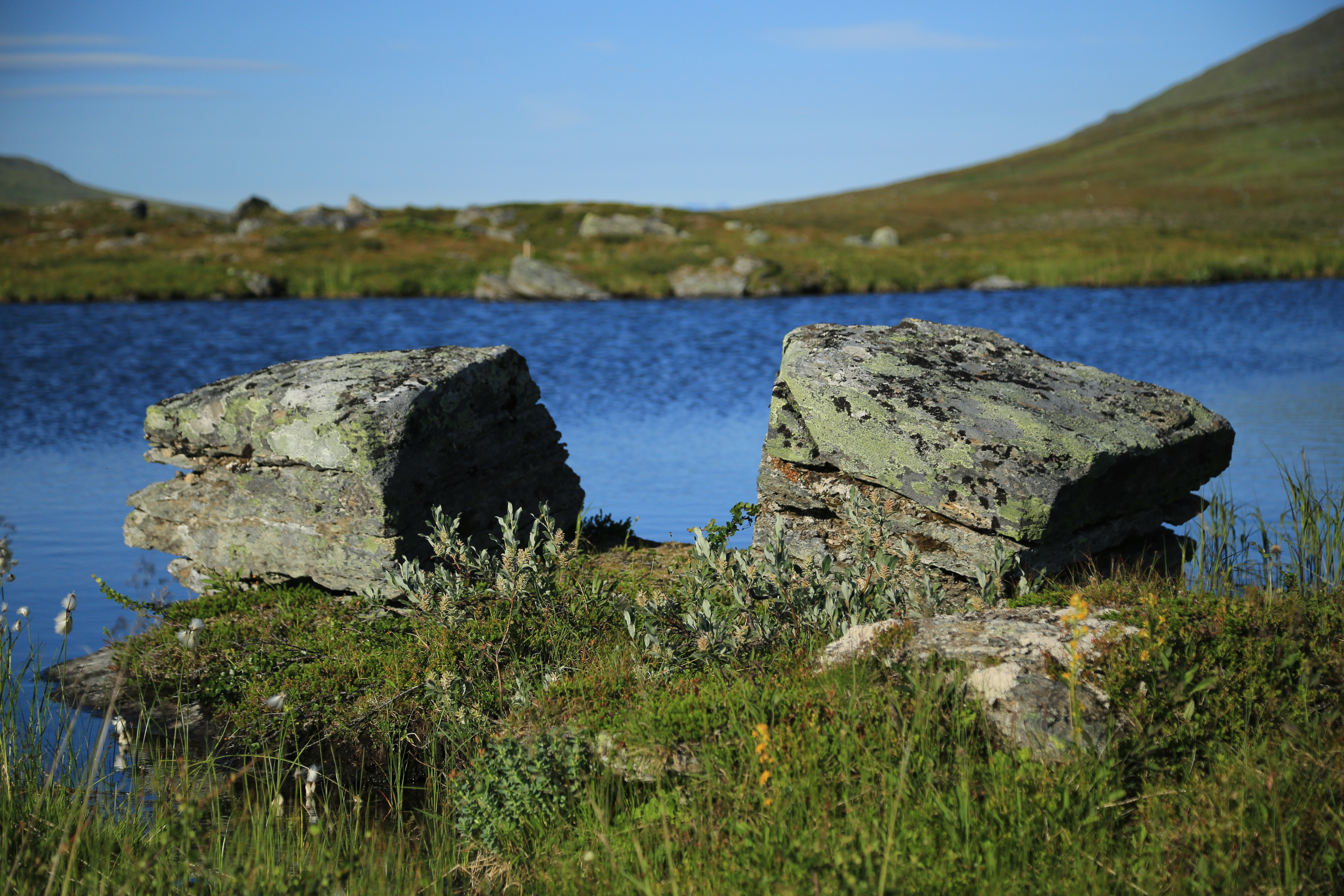

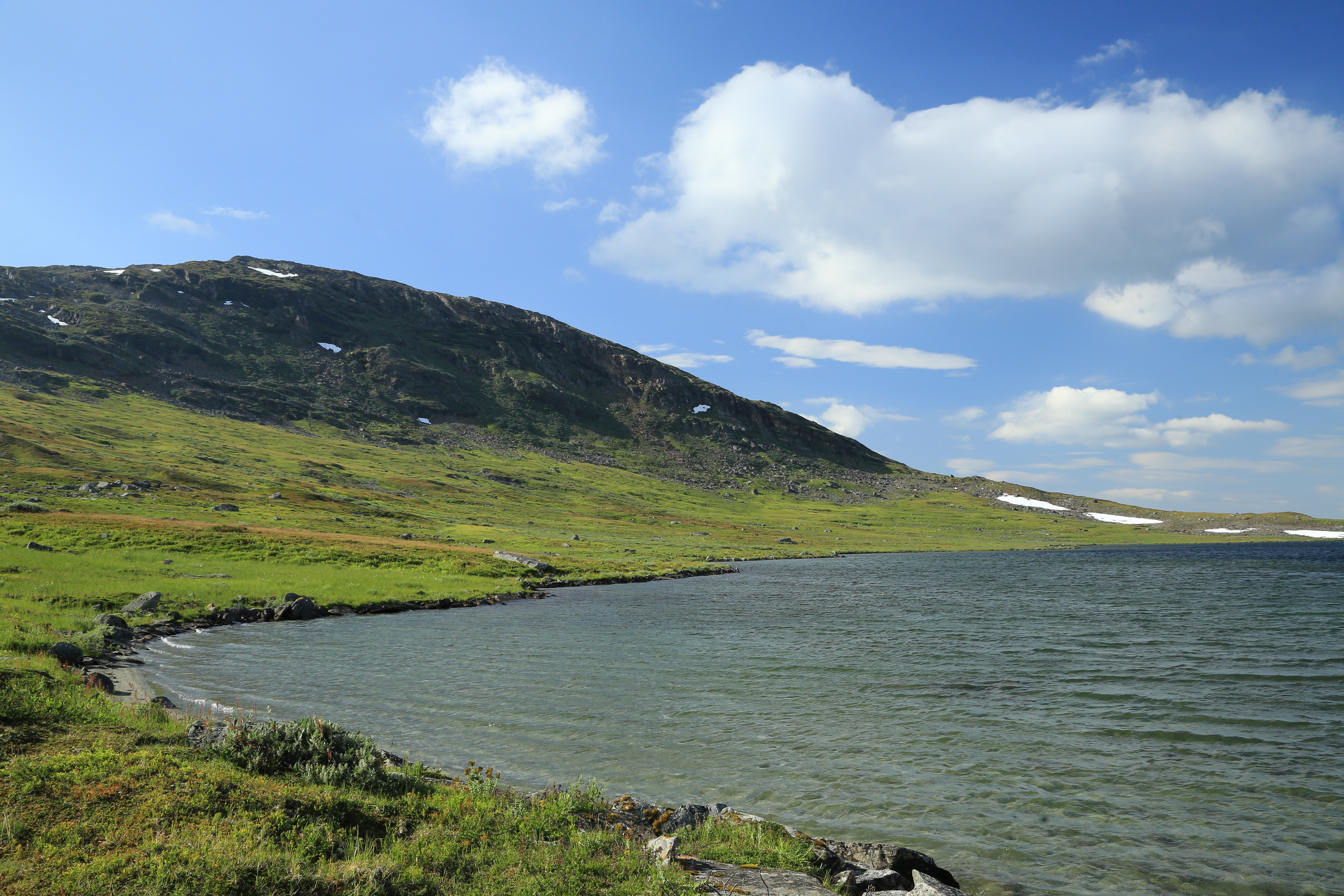

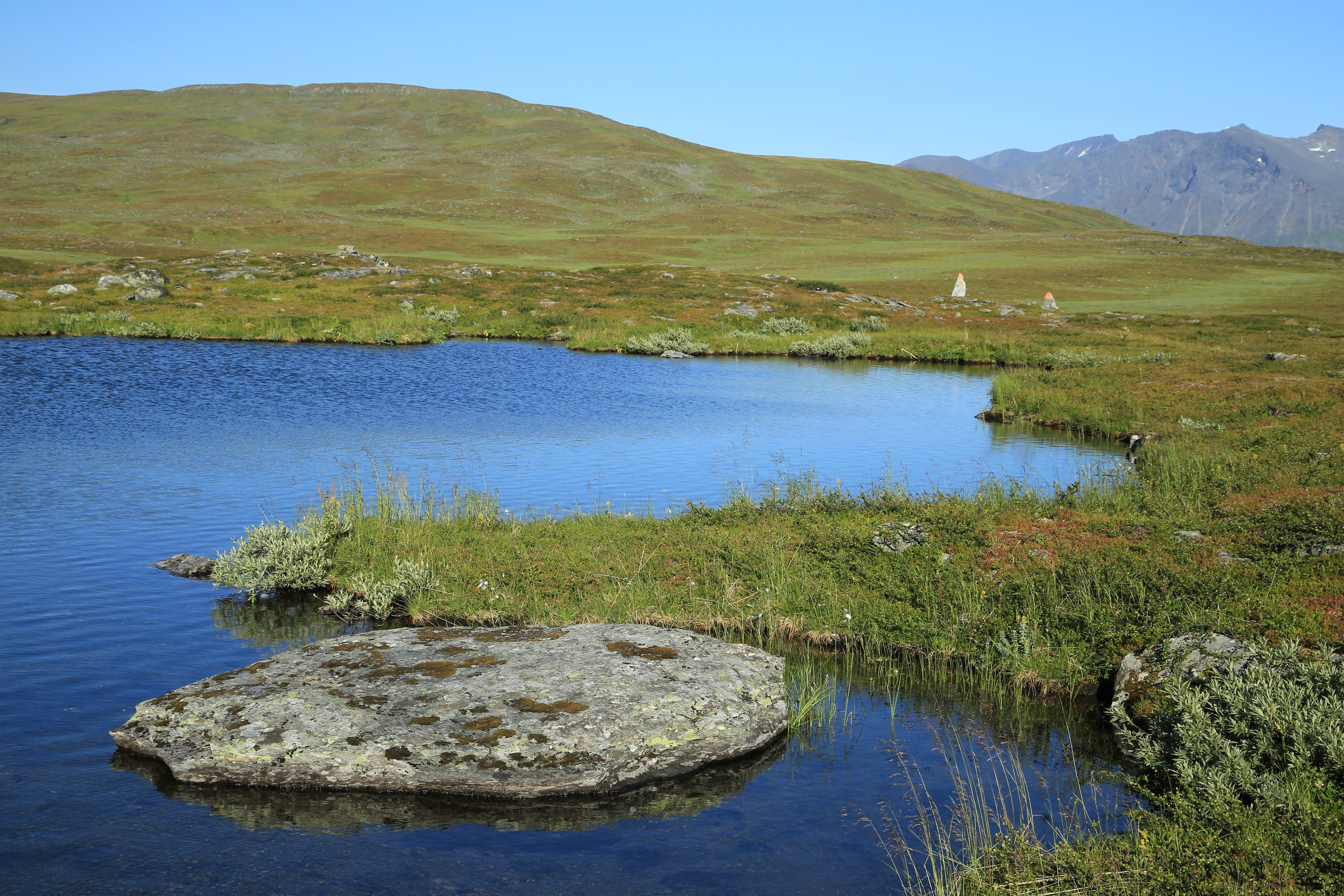

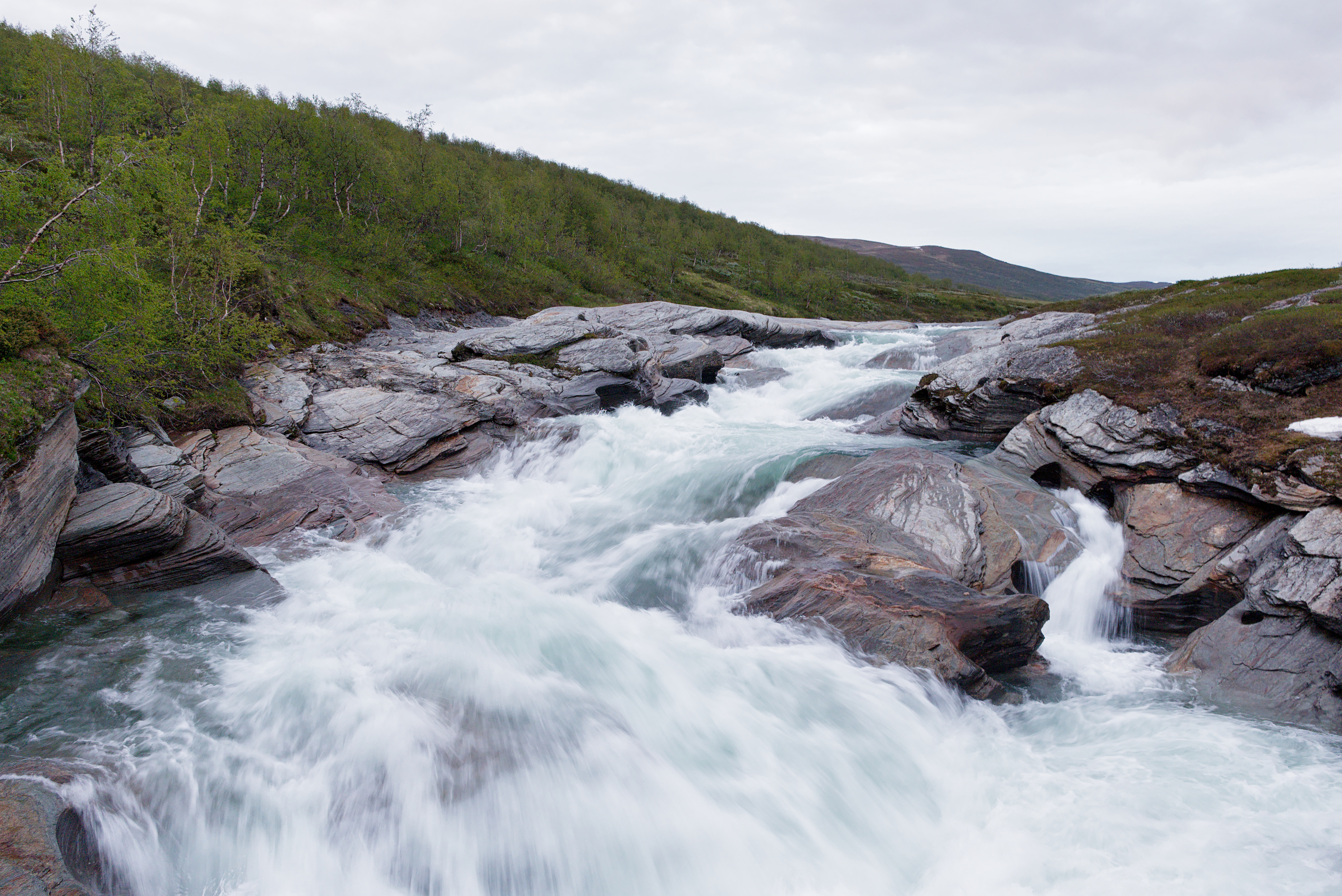
Låddejåhkå river

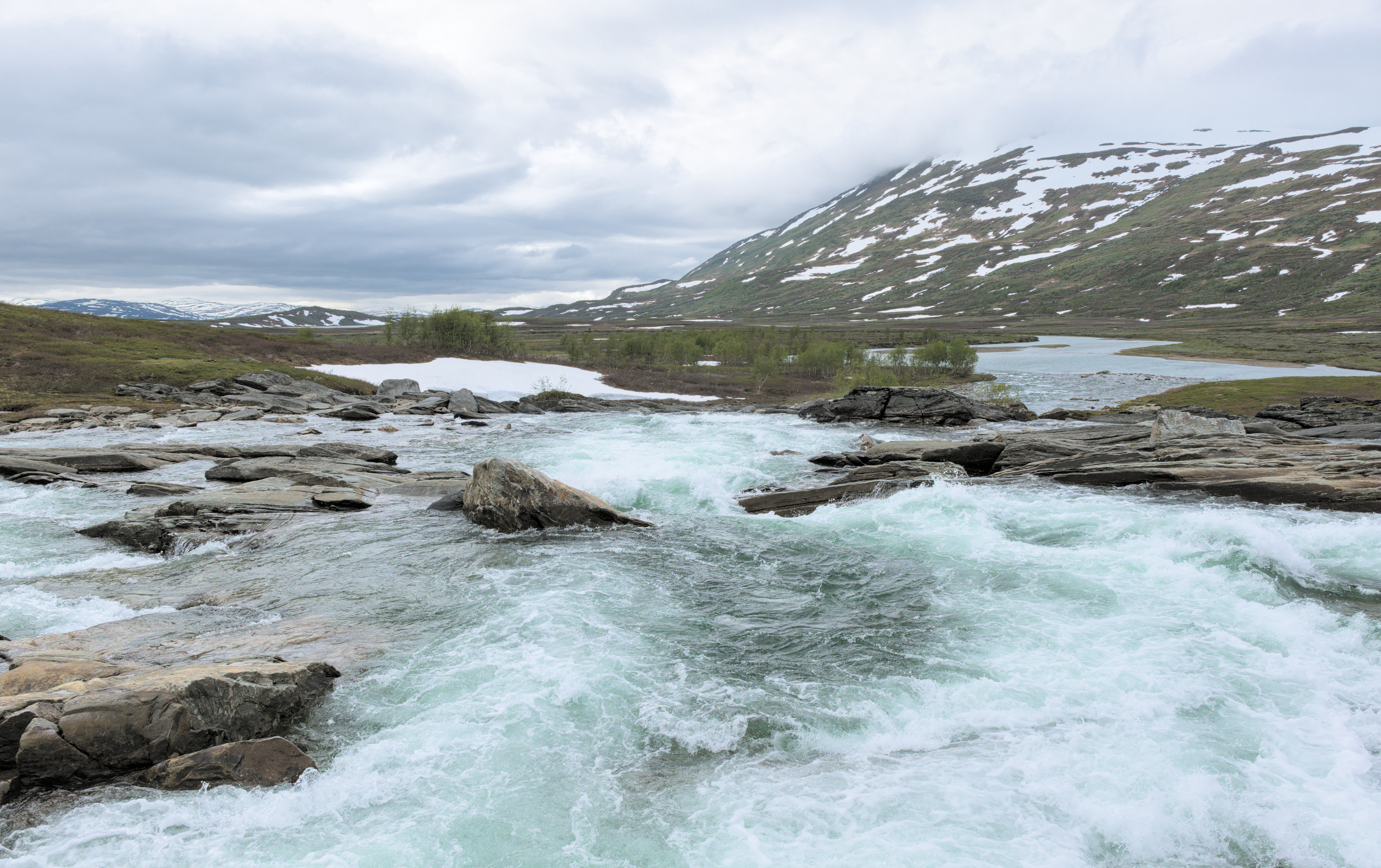
Miellätno river
