= Bov =

Bov or BOV may refer to:

== Places ==
- Bov, Bulgaria, a village in Svoge municipality, Sofia Province
- Bov Municipality, Denmark
- Bov Parish, in the Diocese of Haderslev, Aabenraa Municipality, Denmark
- Bov Point, Antarctica

== Transport and technology ==
- BOV (armoured personnel carrier), a Yugoslav wheeled armored personnel carrier
- Blowoff valve, an element of most turbocharged engines
- Bug-out vehicle, used by survivalists for emergency evacuation
- Bailout valve, in scuba diving with a rebreather

== Other uses ==
- Bov (mythology), or Bodb Derg, a king in Irish mythology
- Bank of Valletta, Malta
- MVDOL (ISO 4217 code BOV), a Bolivian account currency tied to the US dollar
