= Eissporthalle =

Eissporthalle (literally: ice sports hall) is German for an indoor ice rink. Most of them are used for ice hockey.

Specific ice rinks include:

- Eissporthalle Frankfurt
- Eissporthalle Gletscher
- Eissporthalle Iserlohn
- Eissporthalle Kassel
- Eissporthalle an der Jafféstraße
