= Kitsiputous =

Waterfall in Finland

Coordinates: 69.068969°N 20.674909°E

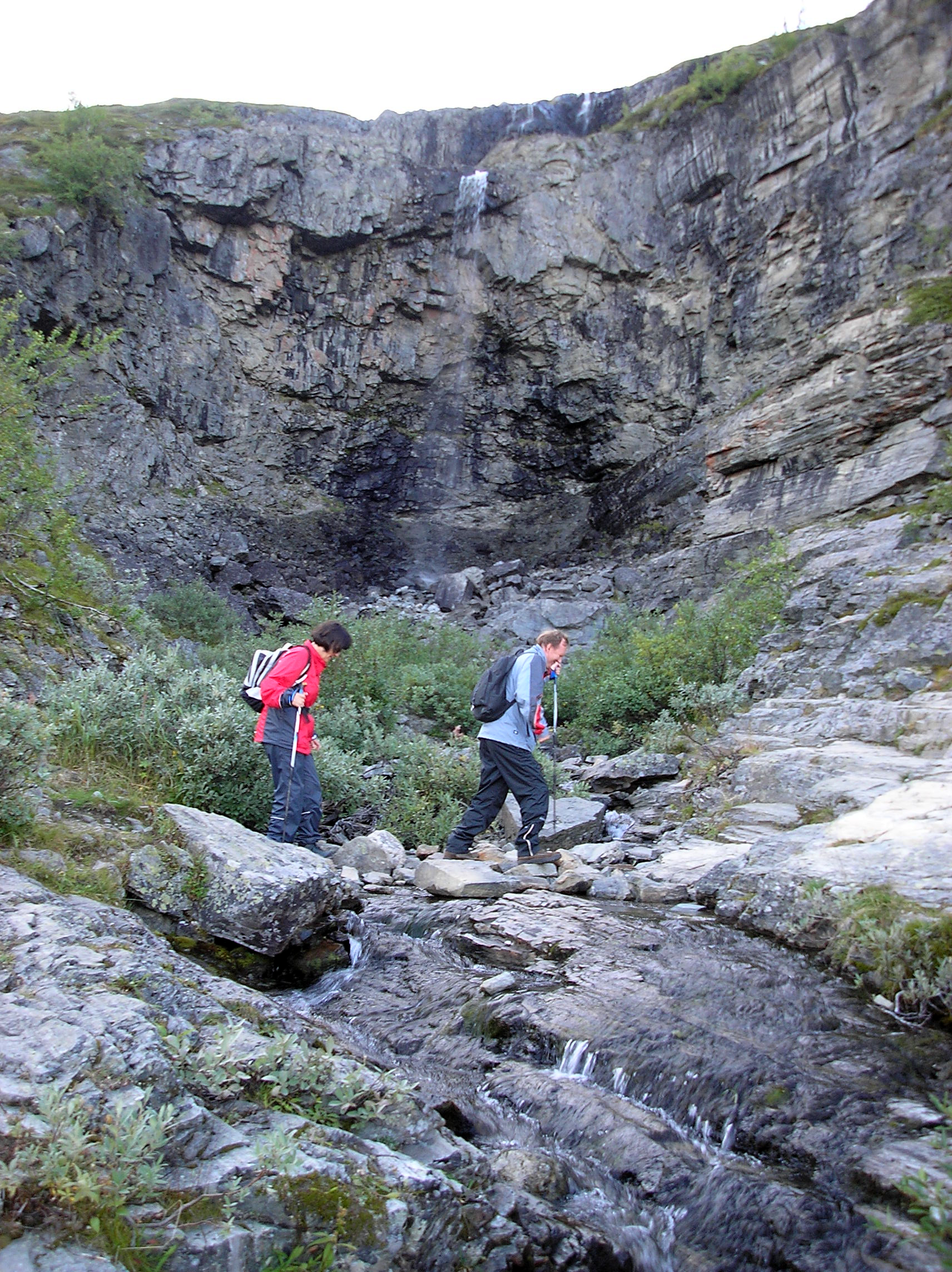
Two hikers near the falls. At the time of taking the picture, the flow is low as the meltwater recedes.

Kitsiputous, located in Enontekiö is one of the highest waterfalls in Finland.

The falls are located along the hiking trail leading to the Three Nations' Border Point. The waterfalls turn into frozen waterfalls during winter.

== See also ==
- List of waterfalls
