= Flensburger EC =

- City: Flensburg
- League: Regionalliga
- Founded: 1984
- Home arena: Eissporthalle Gletscher (capacity: 300)
- Colours

Franchise history
- Flensburger Eissportclub

Flensburger EC (German: Flensburger Eissportclub), later called Flensburg-Harrisleer Eissportclub (1986) is a German hockey and ice sport club.

Established in 1984, the Flensburger EC started with the sports of ice hockey, ice stock sport and figure skating. Their home arena was the Gletscher Eissporthalle in Harrislee-Kupfermühle. Since 2003 the Flensburger EC has been inactive.

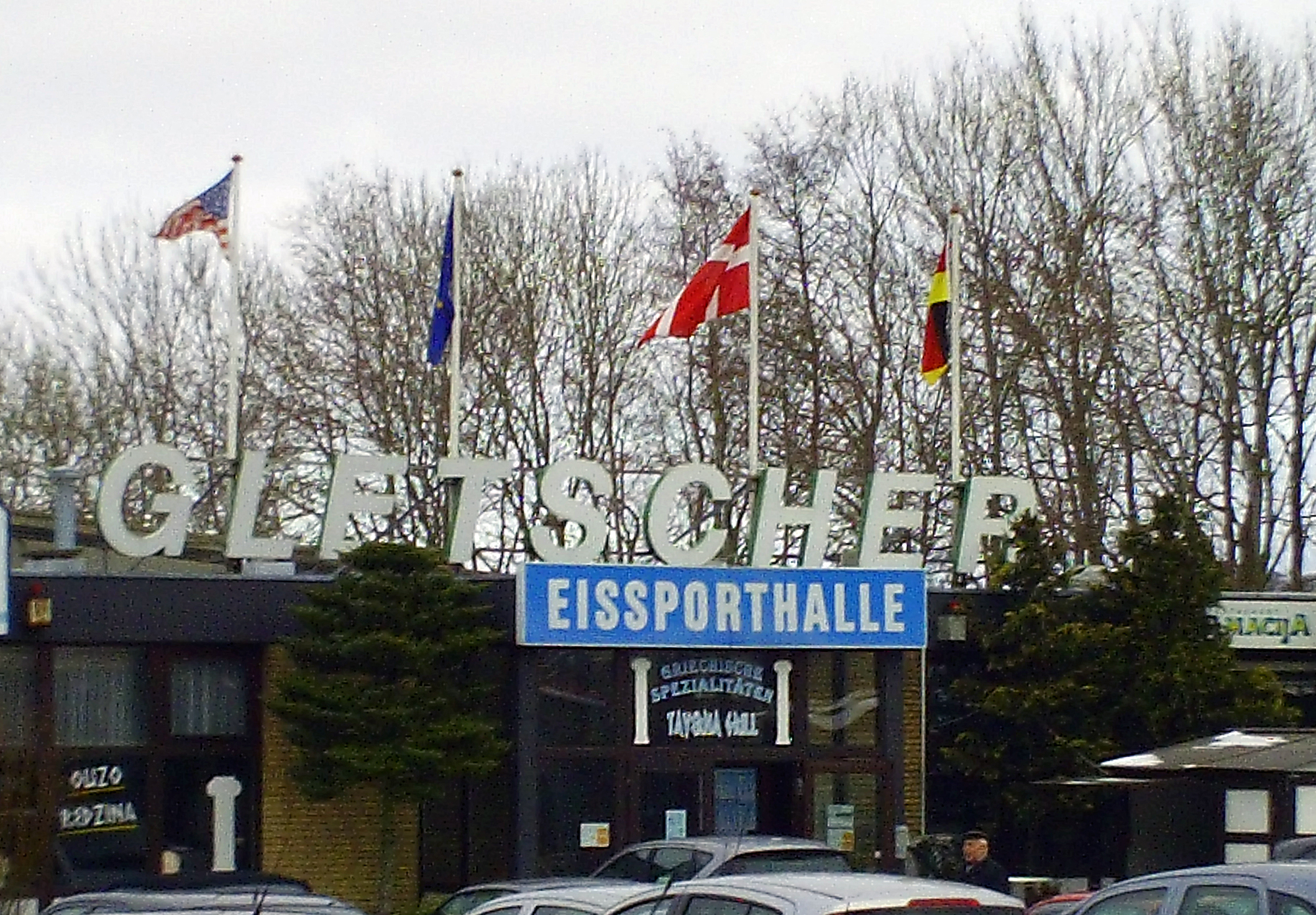
Eissporthalle Gletscher, the Home Arena of the Flensburger EC

== Hockey ==
Mostly Flensburg's ice hockey team played in the Landesliga, a regional division for teams from north Germany. In 1989 the team rose to the Regionalliga Nord and played there for two years. Also Flensburg reached the cup finals for northern hockey teams in 1995 and in 1998. but lost both matches. In 2003 the club got into financial trouble and could not pay the rent to practise any more. Since season 2003/2004 Flensburg EC has been inactive.

== Ice stock sport ==
Ice stock sport was also established in 1984. They played in Division 1, the German Bundesliga Nord, a semi-professional League for ice stock sport in North Germany. 1989 and 1990 Flensburg EC became regional champion of Schleswig-Holstein. In 1994 the ice stock team left Flensburger EC and went to SV Adelby, another Sportclub in Flensburg. Today, they are still there.
