= Fårhus =

Village in Southern Denmark

- Village
- Location in Region of Southern Denmark Fårhus (Denmark)
- Coordinates: 54°51′33″N 9°19′35″E
- Country: Denmark
- Region: Southern Denmark
- Municipality: Aabenraa

Area
  - Urban: 0.27 km^{2} (0.10 sq mi)

Population (2026)
  - Urban: 228
  - Urban density: 840/km^{2} (2,200/sq mi)
- Time zone: UTC+1 (CET)
  - Summer (DST): UTC+2 (CEST)
- Postal code: DK-6330 Padborg
- Website: www.aabenraa.dk

Fårhus is a village in Aabenraa Municipality, Region of Southern Denmark, with a population of 228 as of 1 January, 2026. Fårhus is located 5 km north of Padborg and 14 km north of Flensburg, in Germany.

Fårhus belongs to Bov Parish.

In Frøslev, south of Fårhus, lies the Frøslev Prison Camp, which was a Danish internment camp built during the German occupation of Denmark.
