= Pitsusköngäs =

Waterfall in Lapland

Coordinates: 69°12′03″N 021°16′46″E

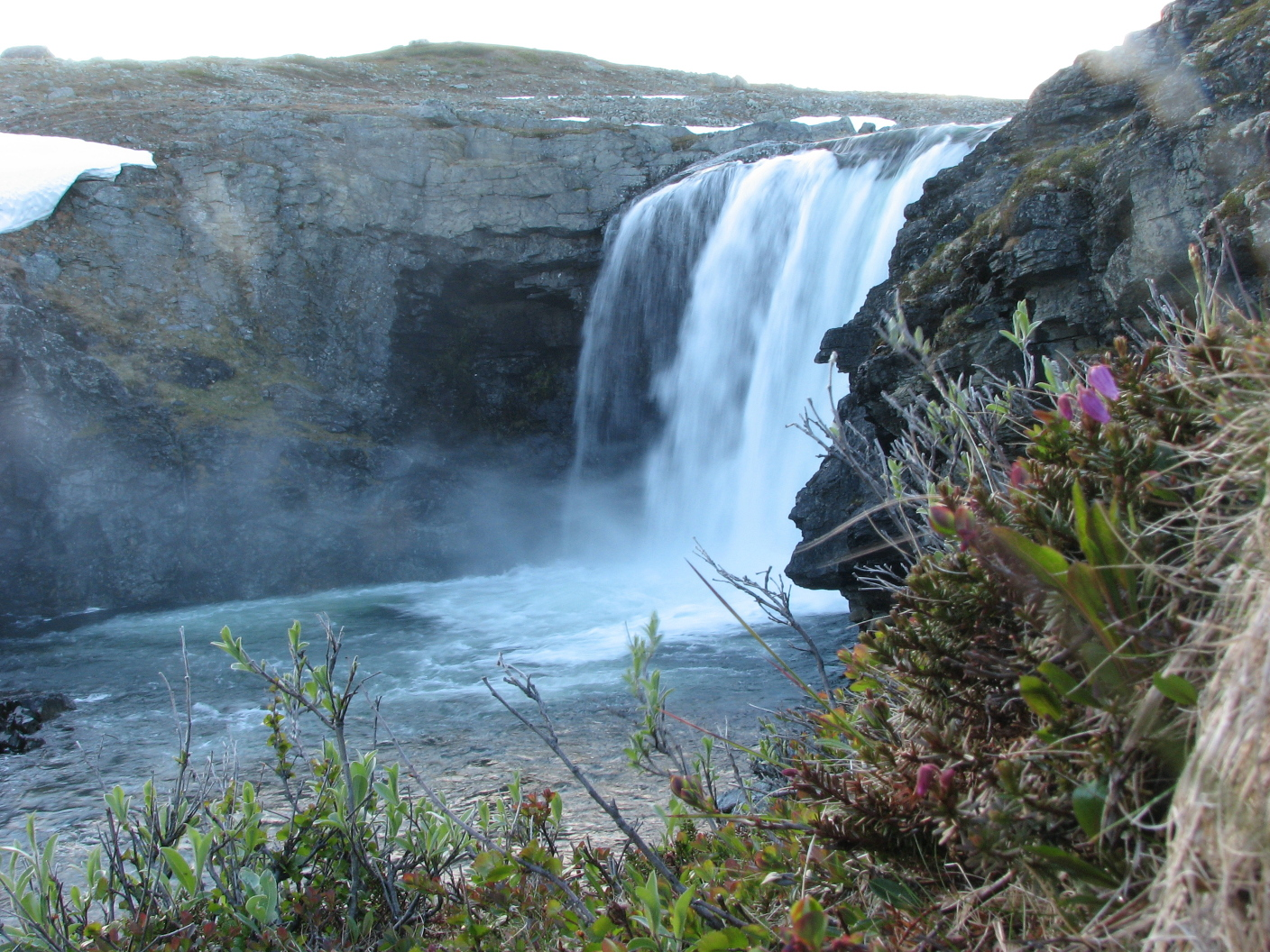
Pihtsusköngäs

Pitsusköngäs (also spelled Pihtsusköngäs, Finnish pronunciation: [ˈpihtsusˌkøŋːæs]; Northern Sami: Bihčosgorži), also known as the "Niagara of Finland" or the "King of Finnish waterfalls", is the largest waterfall in all of Finland. Its maximum height is 17 metres (56 ft). It is located in the Käsivarsi Wilderness Area, about 45 kilometres (28 mi) from the village Kilpisjärvi within the municipality of Enontekiö. It is accessible by following the Nordkalottleden Trail, an 800 kilometer hiking route than runs through Finland, Sweden and Norway.

== See also ==
- List of waterfalls
