= Padjelanta rock art =

Rock art site in Sweden

The Padjelanta rock art site (Swedish: Padjelanta hällkonstplats) is a set of Sámi Rock Art carvings in Padjelanta National Park in northern Sweden.

== History of rock art at Padjelanta ==
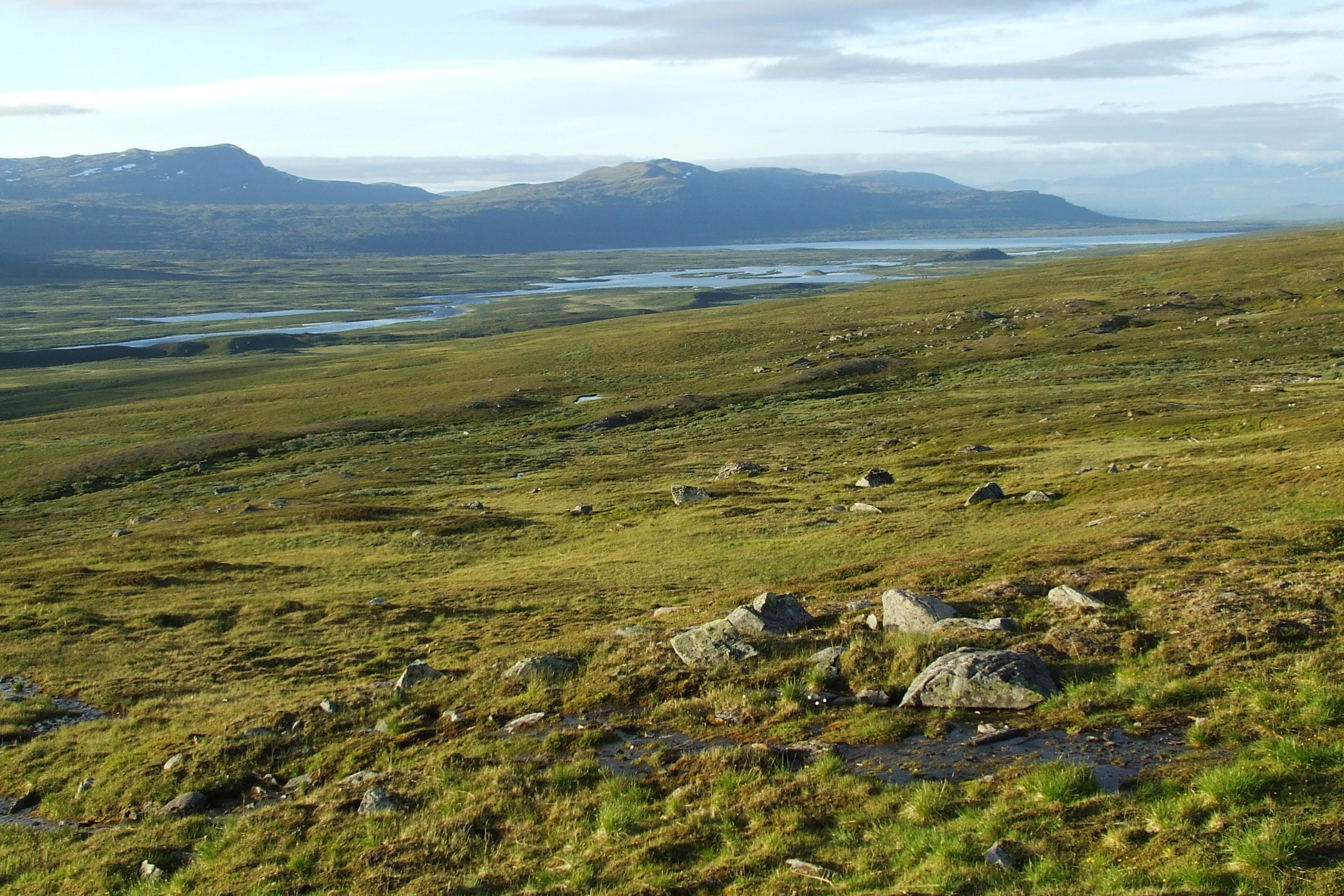
Vuojatädno, a watercourse in Padjelanta

The rock carvings are carved into soapstone mountainside. The early carvings feature harnessed Reindeer, an animal of great importance to the Sámi well as anthropomorphs which may be early representations of the Finno-Uralic female deity Máttaráhkká. In the pre-Viking, Bronze Age asbestos-ceramic period, the site was used for soapstone and asbestos mining. It may have also had spiritual significance to the Reindeer-herding Sámi. There is more recent graffiti at the site, including carvings of the dates '1673 VI' and the modern date '1990'. The site seems to have only been used by the Sámi for both carvings and mining and not by Nordic populations.

== Depictions of boats ==
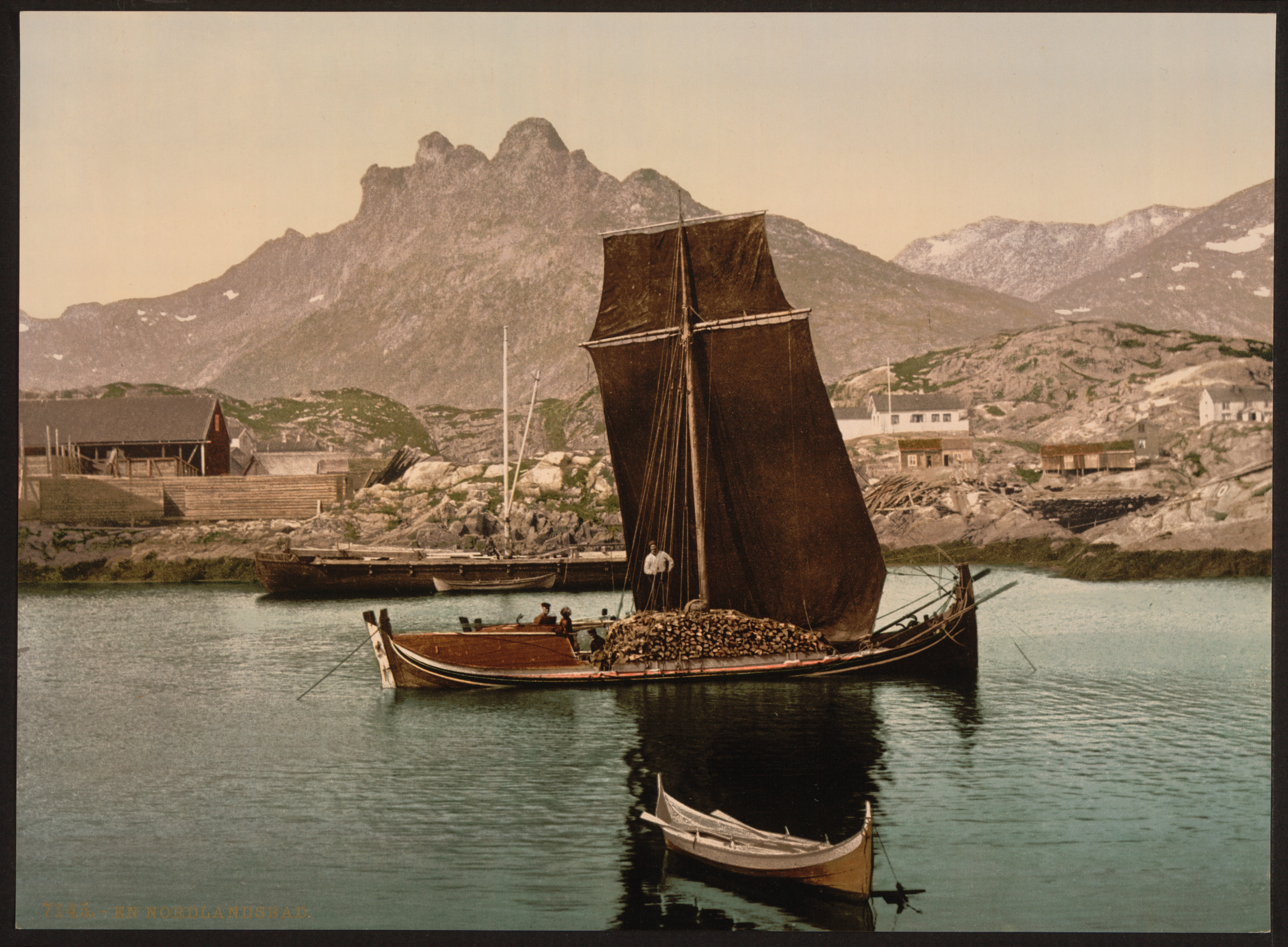
Two modern Nordland Boats in Norway

Among the rock carvings there are depictions of six boats, four of which have sails and rigging. Some of the boats feature oars and one boat tows a smaller dinghy behind it. Some boats may represent Sámi or Nordic fishing boats and some of the larger examples may depict Sámi-made Nordic trading vessels from around the Lofoten-Vesterålen coast, like the Nordland Boat. This suggests that the boat carvings were carved during or after the Viking age, from around 800–1300 CE.
