= Eissporthalle Gletscher =

Indoor ice rink in Kupfermühle, Schleswig-Holstein, Germany

Coordinates: 54°50′17″N 9°24′19″E

The Eissporthalle Gletscher, is a German Icesport arena, which lies in Kupfermühle, near the border between Germany and Denmark. The EIssporthalle Gletscher was the home arena of the Flensburger EC. The arena belongs to the Hotel des Nordens and the Danish Fleegard-Group.

Built in 1983, the arena is mostly used by ice skaters. The arena can be used between November first and April first every year. Between 1985 and 2004, the Flemsburgs Ice Hockey Team played its league matches at "Gletscherhalle". The seating capacity is 300. The arena can be used also for sports like Figure Skating or Ice stock sport, but not for Curling. During the ice skating season, there is an Ice Disco held once a week.

Every year the Aggewars, an ice stock tournament is held in the arena.

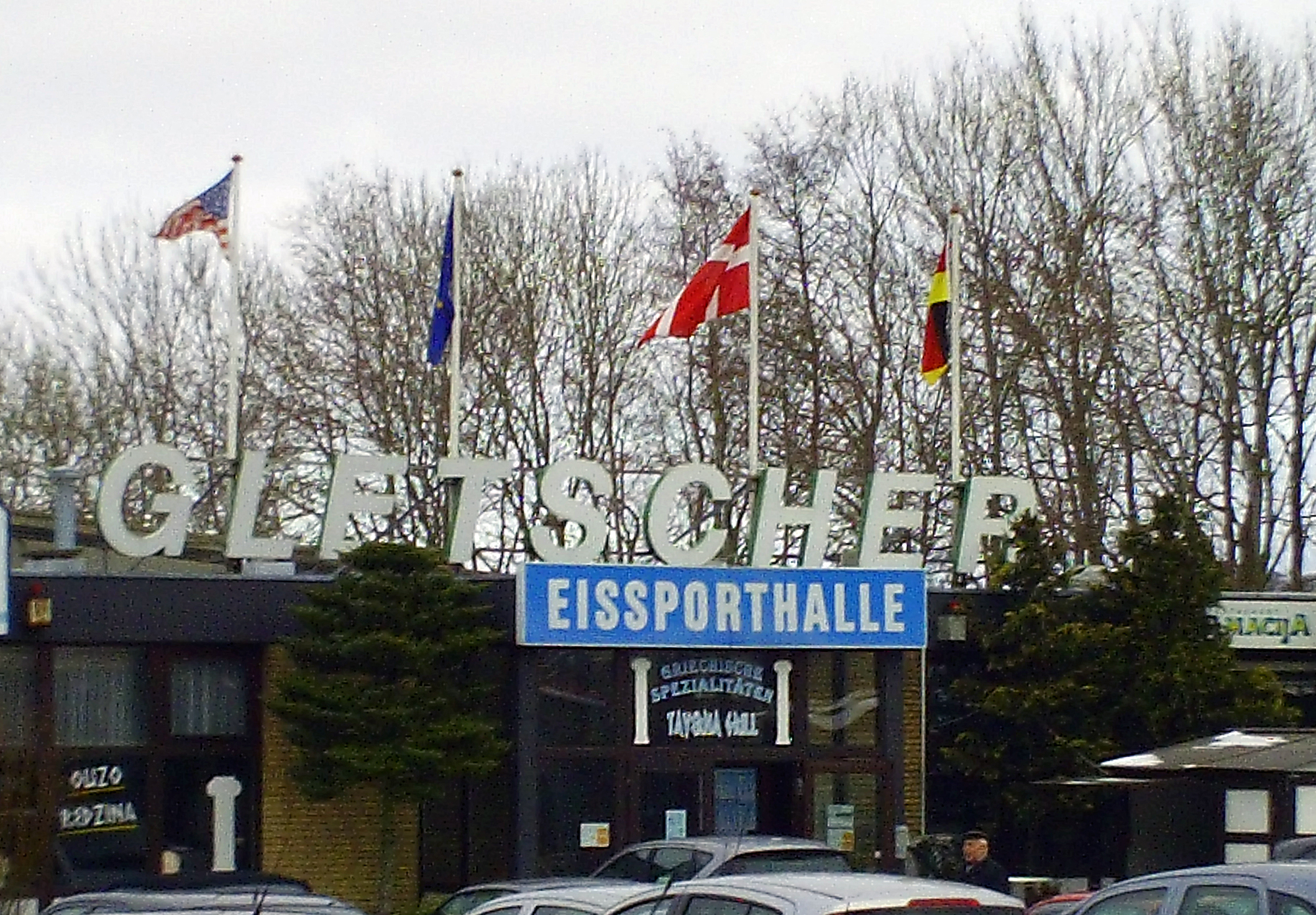
Eissporthalle Gletscher
