= Øvre Dividal National Park =

National park in Troms, Norway

- Øvre Dividal nasjonalpark
- IUCN category II (national park)

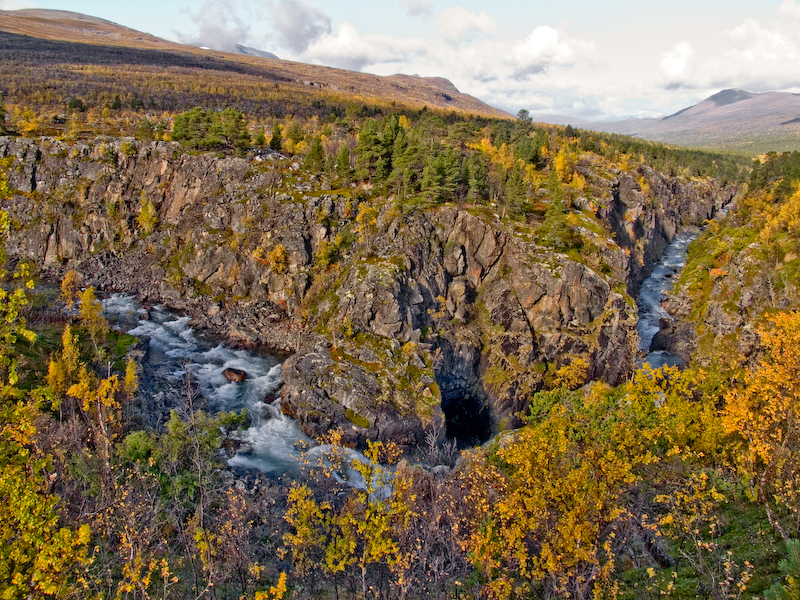
- Autumn colors in Dividal near the Anjajohka river
- Interactive map of Øvre Dividal National Park
- Location: Målselv, Troms, Norway
- Nearest city: Narvik
- Coordinates: 68°38′N 19°52′E
- Area: 750 km^{2} (290 sq mi)
- Established: 9 July 1971
- Governing body: Norwegian Environment Agency

Øvre Dividal National Park (Norwegian: Øvre Dividal nasjonalpark; Northern Sami: Dieváidvuovddi álbmotmeahcci) is a national park in Målselv Municipality in Troms county, Norway. The park was opened in 1971 and has an area of 750 square kilometres (290 sq mi). The original intention was to preserve a largely undisturbed inland valley and mountain area. The hiking trail Nordkalottruta passes through the national park.

== Name ==
The first element in the name Dividal is from the river name Divielva (literally Divi River). Divi is from the Northern Sami language word dievvá which means 'round and dry hill'. The last element is from the Norwegian language word dal which means 'dale' or 'valley'. The word øvre means 'upper' in Norwegian, thus 'the upper part of Dividal'.

== Nature ==
=== Flora ===
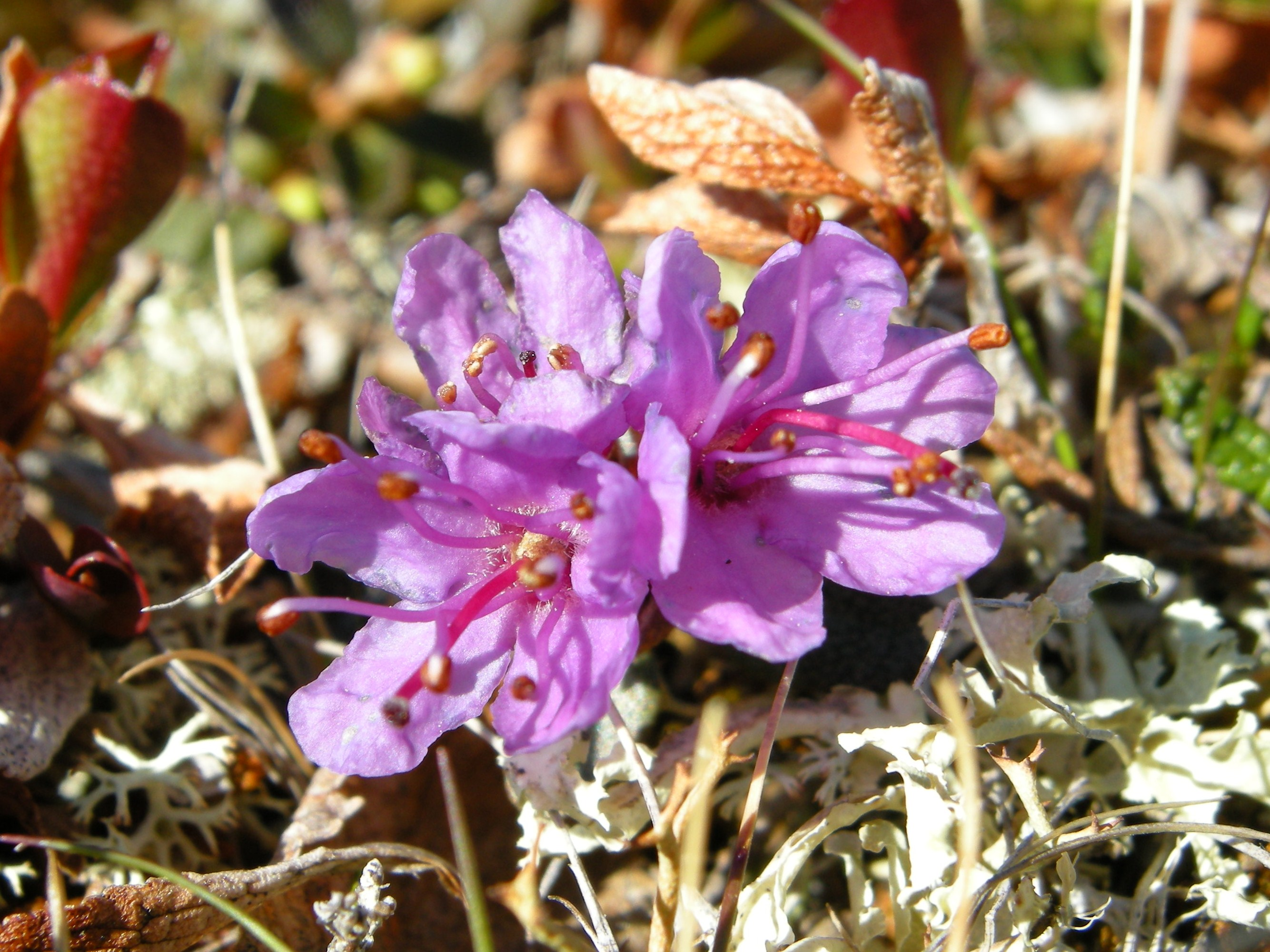
Arctic rhododendron (Rhododendron lapponicum)

Pine forests at the lowest elevations give way to mountain birch higher up, and finally willow and dwarf birch on the open alpine tundra. Some grey alder (Alnus incana) grows along the Divi river. A total of 315 plant species have been recorded. Rhododendron (Rhododendron lapponicum) grows naturally in the area.

=== Fauna ===
All large predators on the mainland are represented in the park (Eurasian brown bear, Eurasian wolf, wolverine, northern lynx), although wolf is rare and probably has no permanent presence. The wolverine is especially numerous in this area. Reindeer (Sami-owned) are common, as are moose. The Arctic fox used to be living in the area.

== Climate ==
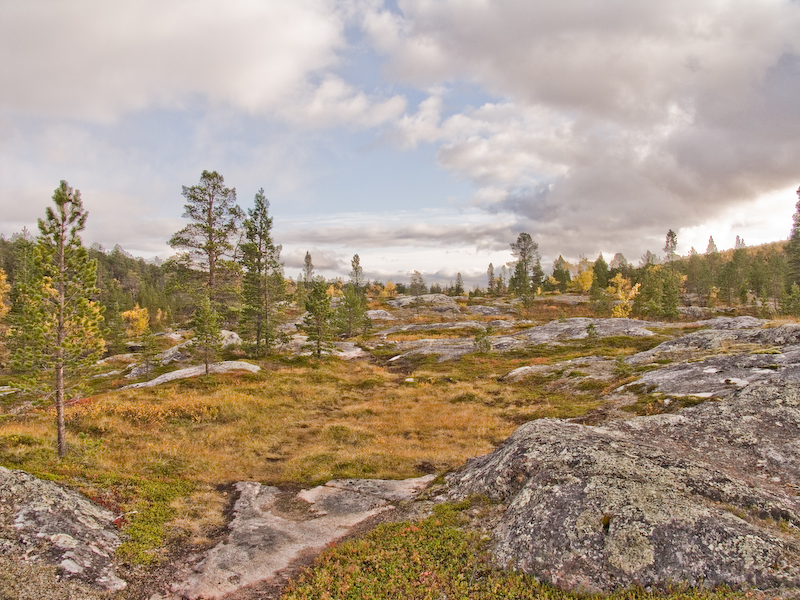
Part of Øvre Dividal

At 228 m (748 ft) above sea level, Dividalen is the second-driest valley in Norway, with average annual precipitation only 282 millimetres (11.1 in). The monthly 24-hour averages for the same location varies from −9 °C (16 °F) in January to 13 °C (55 °F) in July with a mean annual of 0.8 °C (33.4 °F). There is no permafrost in the lower elevations of the park. At altitudes above 700 metres (2,300 ft), permafrost is common. The Øvre Dividal National Park starts at an elevation of about 300 m (980 ft) and reaches up to 1,600 m (5,200 ft). Together with areas in bordering Sweden, as well as almost undisturbed areas nearby in Norway, this park is part of a larger wilderness area.

== Geology ==
The bedrock consists of conglomerate, sandstone and slate. Several rivers have carved ravines. A peculiarity is large rocks placed at unlikely locations. These were carried by the ice-age glaciers, and deposited randomly at the end of the ice age.
