= Padjelanta National Park =

National park in Sweden

- Padjelanta nationalpark
- IUCN category II (national park)
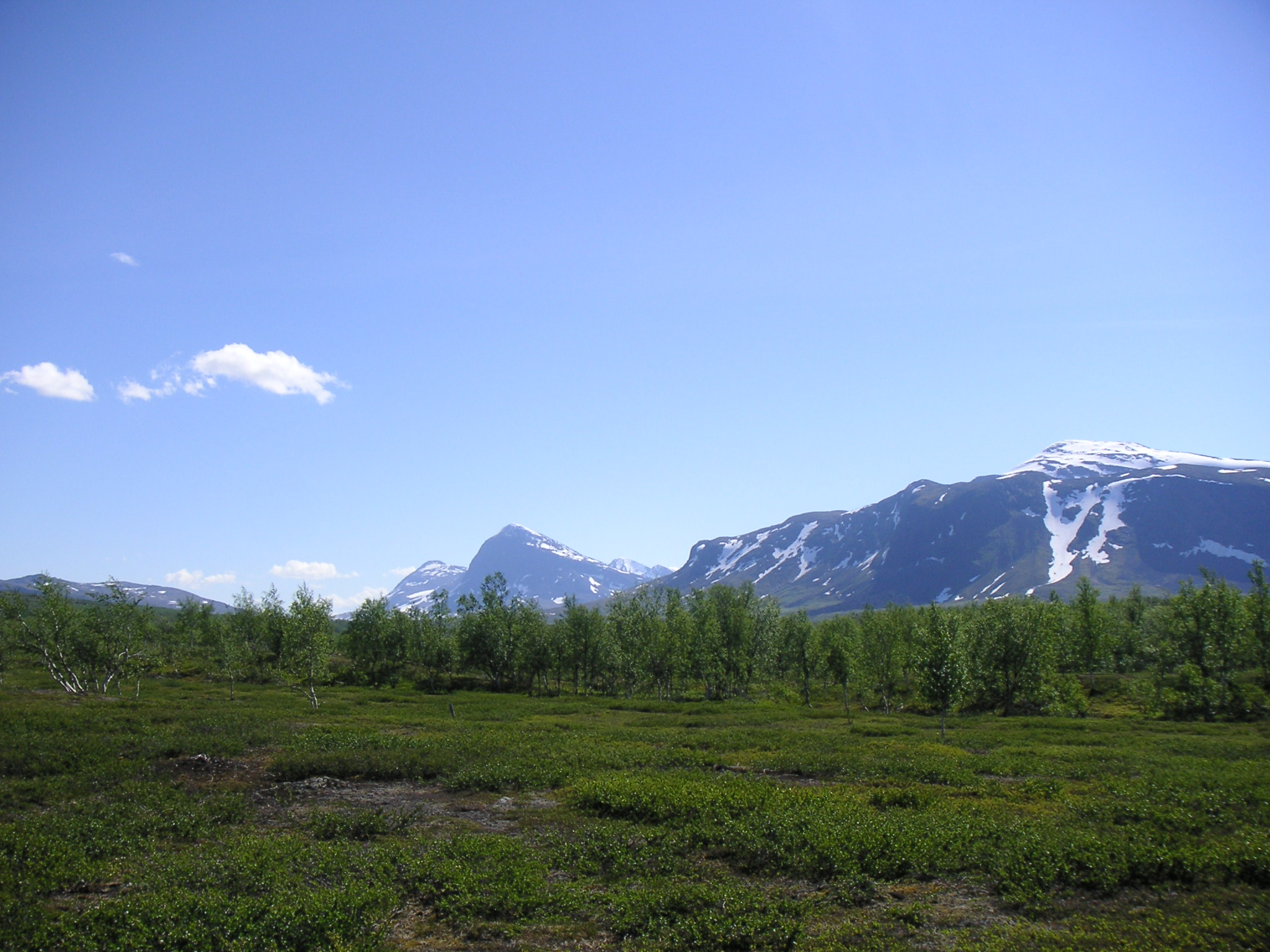
- Niják and Gisuris viewed from Padjelanta National Park, July 2005
- Interactive map of Padjelanta National Park
- Location: Norrbotten County, Sweden
- Coordinates: 67°22′N 16°48′E
- Area: 1,984 km^{2} (766 sq mi)
- Established: 1962
- Governing body: Naturvårdsverket

National parks of Sweden (clickable map)

Padjelanta (Swedish: Padjelanta nationalpark) is a national park in Norrbotten County in northern Sweden. Established in 1963, (Note: The year after the Swedish Parliament voted yes to the proposal.) it is the largest national park in Sweden with an area of 1,984 km^{2} (766 mi^{2}), and part of the UNESCO World Heritage Site Laponia established in 1996.

== Etymology and the presence of the Sámi people ==
The name of the park derives from the Lule Sami word Badjelánnda, which translates to the higher land – a straightforward description of the region. Today the three Sámi villages Duorbun, Jåhkågasska and Sirges let their reindeer graze in Padjelanta in the summer, using the traditional settlements of Stáloluokta, Árasluokta and Sállohávrre. Several panels of rock art substantiate a longstanding Sámi inhabitation of Padjelanta.

== Nature ==
The park, which borders on Norway in the west, is primarily comprised by a vast plateau around the two unusually large lakes Vastenjávrre and Virihávrre – the latter of which is often referred to as "the most beautiful lake in Sweden". Consequently, the landscape is fairly flat and open, especially compared to the alpine Sarek National Park on its eastern border, and mainly consists of rolling hills with few peaks of the higher variety.

=== Plants ===
Most of the park is situated above the tree line; meaning few species of trees can survive the harsh climate of the park. The exposure of strong winds and the cold winters has made it so that the only tree that can exist in any relevant numbers is the small and robust Betula pubescens subsp. tortuosa (mountain birch). These form a small forest of 1,400 hectares or 3,500 acres) in the northeast corner of the park. The diversity of the flora is extremely high, nonetheless: over 400 different lower plant (thallophytes) species have been cataloged in the area, which reportedly is a record in the Swedish fells (highlands). This is due to its western position and chalk-rich bedrock. Some of these species, such as Arenaria humifusa and Gentiana aurea, can only be found in the Swedish fell regions and Potentilla robbinsiana is a plant that, in Europe, has only ever been found in Padjelanta.

=== Lichens ===
Padjelanta National Park is home to an exceptionally rich and diverse lichen flora. A 2023 study documented 10 lichen species new to Sweden and 98 species new to the Lule lappmark region within the park. Notable finds include Arthonia protoparmeliae, new to both Sweden and Norway, and the rediscovery of the endangered Degelia plumbea after 79 years. The park's varied geology, including areas of calcareous and ultramafic rock, contributes to this lichen diversity. While only six red-listed lichen species were recorded, this likely reflects insufficient assessment of alpine lichen species rather than a lack of conservation concern. The study highlights Padjelanta's importance as a "lichen diversity heaven" and its significance for lichen conservation in Scandinavia.

=== Animals ===
Padjelelanta hosts a very limited number of mammals, with a low variety of different species, almost all of which have small populations. The mammals that do exist are mostly lemmings and reindeer, as well as the predators that eat them; in this case the wolverine and the Arctic fox, respectively, both being permanently resident in the park.

Padjelanta's bird-life however is very rich and showcases most species associated with the Swedish bare mountain fell – and fell lake regions. The most typical species on the heath are European golden plover, meadow pipit and northern wheatear but rock ptarmigan, Eurasian dotterel and Eurasian whimbrel are also fairly common sights.

In and around the lakes there are plenty of Anatinae, such as long-tailed duck, Eurasian teal and common scoter as well as many waders, which include red-necked phalarope, ruff, Temminck's stint and common redshank.

The northeast forest is also home to a great variety of species and contains an abundance of common redpoll, willow warbler, Lapland longspur, bluethroat and redwing.

Then there are also many birds that are not really constricted to one area but is spread throughout the park. This include lesser white-fronted goose, gyrfalcon, golden eagle, white-tailed eagle, great snipe, rough-legged buzzard and long-tailed jaeger. During lemming-years you can even see the snowy owl which is otherwise rare seen in Padjelanta.

The park also contains a rich quantity of fish, Vastenjávrre and Virihávrre being especially densely populated.

=== Climate ===
Climate data for Staloluokta 1991–2020 normals (600m)
Month	Jan	Feb	Mar	Apr	May	Jun	Jul	Aug	Sep	Oct	Nov	Dec	Year
Daily mean °C (°F)	−8.0 (17.6)	−8.0 (17.6)	−5.9 (21.4)	−2.0 (28.4)	2.8 (37.0)	7.4 (45.3)	10.7 (51.3)	9.8 (49.6)	5.6 (42.1)	0.5 (32.9)	−3.5 (25.7)	−6.1 (21.0)	0.3 (32.5)
Average precipitation mm (inches)	56.9 (2.24)	49.2 (1.94)	48.2 (1.90)	29.1 (1.15)	32.1 (1.26)	40.5 (1.59)	61.0 (2.40)	51.5 (2.03)	53.8 (2.12)	49.9 (1.96)	44.9 (1.77)	62.2 (2.45)	579.3 (22.81)
Source: NOAA

== History ==
Padjelanta, due to its flourishing meadows and fish filled lakes has long been attractive to humans and the park has been inhabited ever since the Stone Age (one evidence of this being the many trapping pits that have been found and dated back to this period of time). Even today the lakes are utilized for fishing by the Sámi villages. Ever since the birth of modern science the area has also been interesting for scientists, mainly for studying its flora, fauna and geology.

== Tourism ==
There is a well-known hiking trail called Padjelantaleden (Padjelanta Trail) that runs between Kvikkjokk in the southeast and either Vaisaluokta or Änonjalme beneath Áhkká in the north, and is about 140 km in length. All these endpoints lie outside the borders of the park, which means that hikers must travel for at least a day before entering Padjelanta itself, but in the summer there are also regular helicopter tours between Kvikkjokk, Stáloluokta and Ritsem.

Along this trail there are a number of cottage sites providing accommodation for visitors. Originally, the tourist buildings within the park proper were managed by the Swedish Environmental Protection Agency, but they have since passed into the care of the aforementioned Sámi villages, under the name Badjelánnda Laponia Turism (BLT). The other cottages on the trail are maintained by the Swedish Tourist Association (STF). In Stáloluokta there is a sauna, and during the tourist season visitors can also buy provisions there.

Padjelantaleden is a summer trail, so there are no markings visible when the land is covered in snow. Neither are the cottages staffed in winter, but there is always at least one room open at all the cottage sites.

Another hiking trail called Nordkalottruta also passes through the park, although its path is the same as that of Padjelantaleden most of the way.

Another point of interest is that the Swedish center of inaccessibility (i.e. the point where one is at a maximum distance from civilization) lies in Padjelanta. It is reported that at the southeastern bay of the lake Rissájávrre close to the border of Sarek, it is approximately 47 km (29 mi). in either direction to the closest road. The isolation of this spot is, however, partially an illusion, since the much-trodden Padjelantaleden and specifically the Tuottar cottage site are actually less than 5 km (3.1 mi). away.
