= Klingberg =

Klingberg can be both a middle name and a surname. Notable people with the name include:

== Middle name ==
- Peter Klingberg Geschwind, Swedish contemporary artist

== Surname ==
- Bertha Klingberg, German florist
- Börje Klingberg (born 1952), Swedish speedway rider

- Niklas Klingberg (born 1973), Swedish speedway rider, son of Börje

- Carl Klingberg (born 1991), Swedish ice hockey forward
- Christian Klingberg, Danish attorney
- David Klingberg, Australian businessman, civil engineer, and chancellor
- John Klingberg (born 1992), Swedish ice hockey defenceman
- Marcus Klingberg, Polish-Israeli epidemiologist
- Mårten Klingberg, Swedish actor, screenwriter, and director
- Niklas Klingberg (footballer) (born 1985), Swedish football defender
- Torkel Klingberg, Swedish cognitive neuroscientist
