= Three-Country Cairn =

Border tripoint between Sweden, Norway, and Finland

- Kolmen valtakunnan rajapyykki (Finnish); Golmma riikka urna (Northern Sámi); Treriksrøysa (Norwegian); Treriksröset (Swedish)
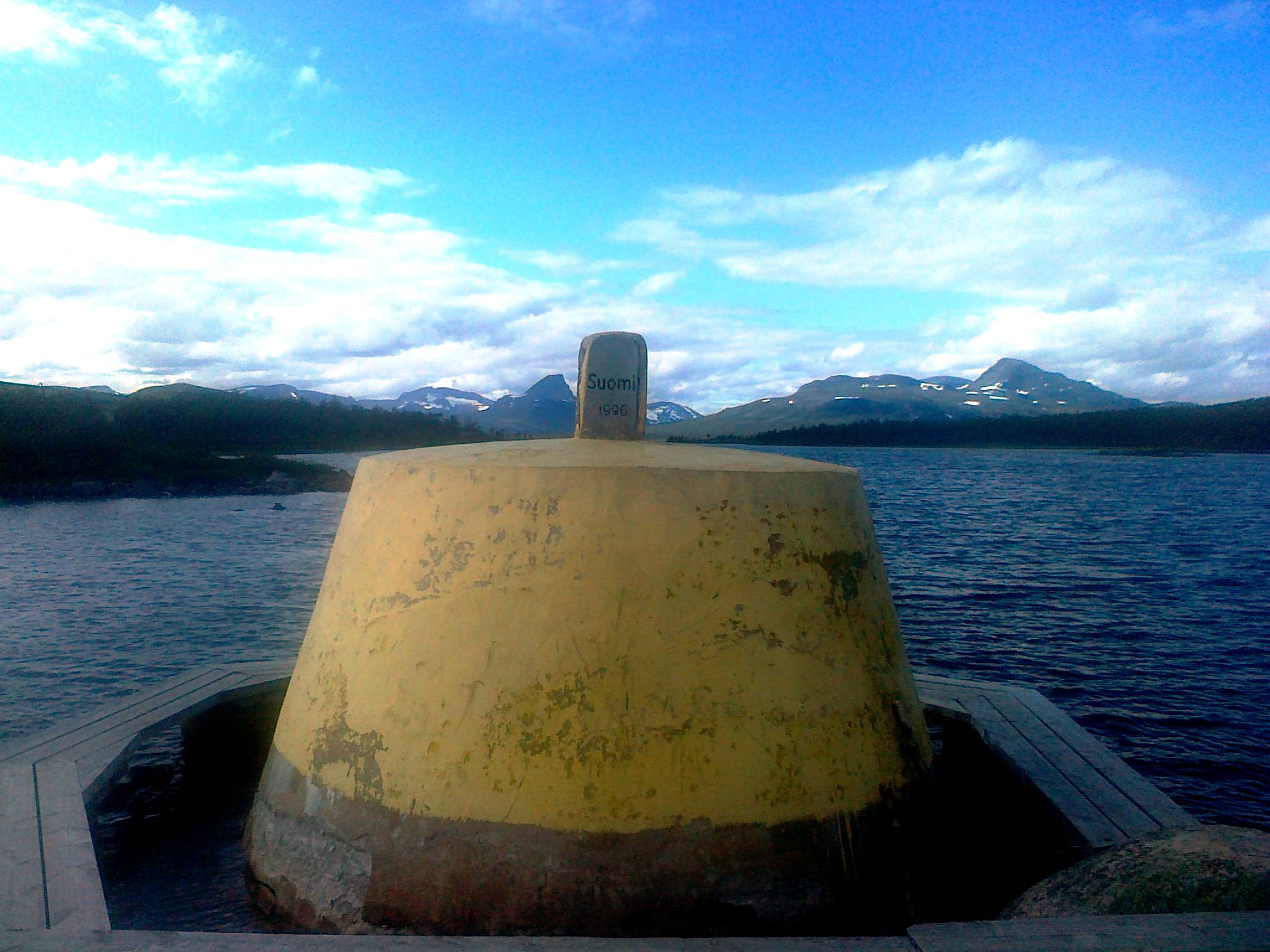
- The cairn in 2014
- Interactive map of Three-Country Cairn
- Coordinates: 69°03′35.9″N 20°32′55.1″E
- Material: Concrete frustum
- Completion date: 1926
- Dedicated to: Marking the tripoint of the borders of Norway, Sweden, and Finland

The Three-Country Cairn (Finnish: Kolmen valtakunnan rajapyykki, Northern Sami: Golmma riikka urna, Norwegian: Treriksrøysa, Swedish: Treriksröset) is the tripoint at which the international borders of Sweden, Norway and Finland meet, and the name of the monument that marks the point. It is the northernmost international tripoint in the world.

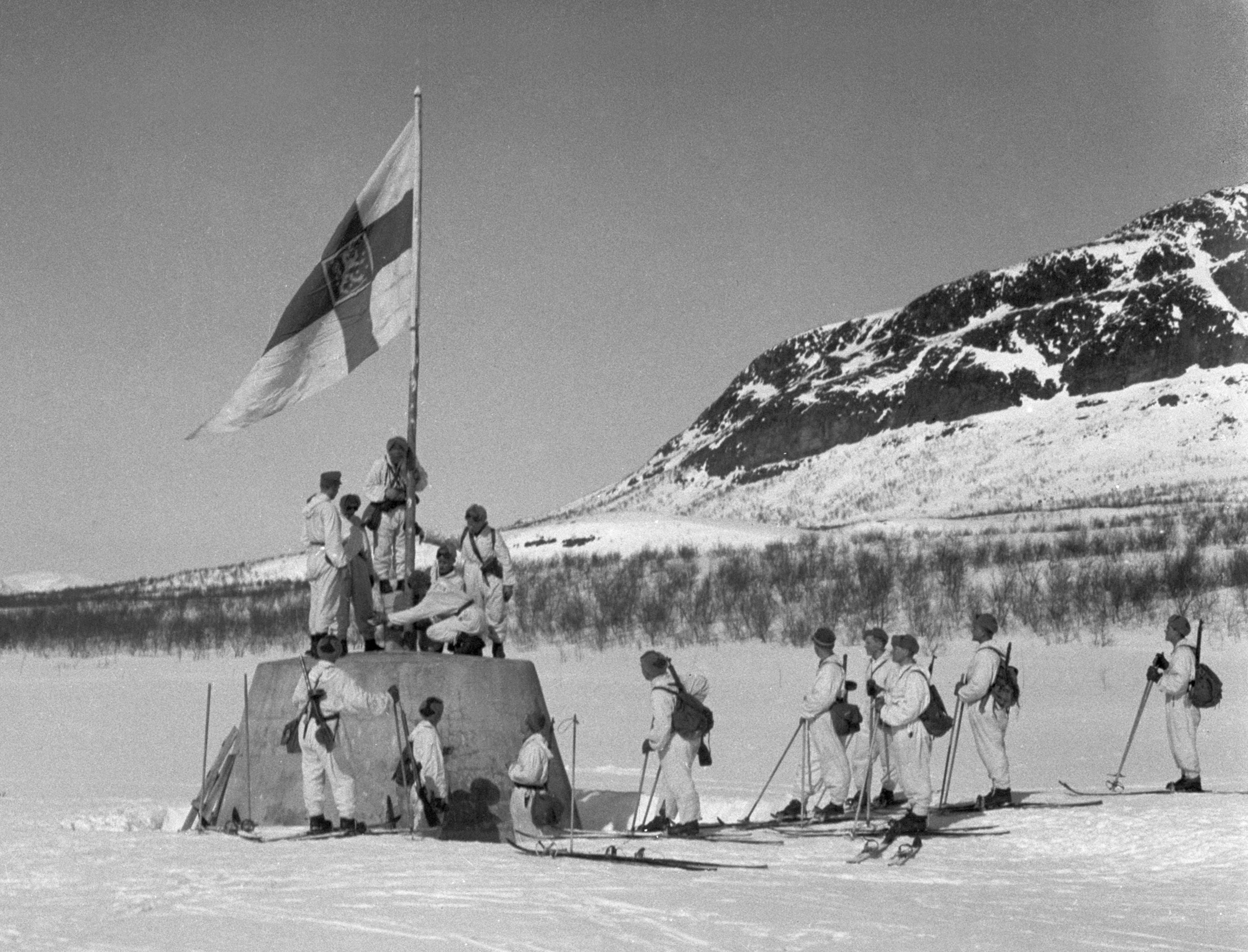
Finnish troops raising a flag on the cairn in April 1945 at the close of the Second World War in Finland

The border between Norway and Sweden including Finland was decided in the Strömstad Treaty of 1751 and marked with cairns the following years, including cairn 294 which is located on a hill 150 meters east of today's Three-Country Cairn. When Sweden ceded Finland to Russia in 1809, it was decided that the new Finland–Sweden border should follow the rivers. But actually, two rivers cross the Norwegian border, and the northern one was originally used; the tripoint was at 69°3′37.4″N 20°33′11.4″E. The tripoint had no mark for several decades. It was decided in 1887 by the governments of Norway and Russia (which was administering Finland at the time) that the southern river was now larger. They erected a stone monument on the site in 1897. The Swedes could not agree on a boundary commission with the Norwegians and did not contribute their stone until 1901. This is Sweden's northernmost point and the westernmost point of the Finnish mainland (the westernmost point of Finland is on the island Märket).

The current tripoint monument was built in 1926 and is a beige, conical frustum made of concrete atop a pile of stones, located about 10 metres (33 ft) out in Lake Goldajärvi (also known as Koltajärvi in Finnish, Golddajávri in Northern Sami, or Koltajaure in Swedish). It is located at 489 metres (1,604 ft) above sea level. The size is about 14 square metres (150 sq ft) with diameter of about 4 metres (13 ft). As an artificial island, it is sometimes mentioned as the world's smallest island divided by a border. This is a matter of definition. For example, in Haparanda/Tornio there are poles in the water marking the border.

The monument may be reached by walking 11 kilometres (6.8 mi) from Kilpisjärvi in Finland along a hiking trail in the Malla Strict Nature Reserve. In summertime, it can be reached by public boat from Kilpisjärvi plus a 3-kilometre (1.9 mi) walk. It can also be reached from Norway, preferably from a hiking trail starting at road E8 near the border. It is much more difficult to reach from within Sweden, requiring at least a 70 km hike each way, including river crossings.

== Climate ==
The climate is very cold (at the border between ET and Dfc), with subarctic winters and tundra-like summers. The average temperature is below freezing.

Climate data for Treriksröset
Month	Jan	Feb	Mar	Apr	May	Jun	Jul	Aug	Sep	Oct	Nov	Dec	Year
Mean daily maximum °C (°F)	−9 (16)	−9 (16)	−4 (25)	−2 (28)	4 (39)	10 (50)	12 (54)	12 (54)	6 (43)	−1 (30)	−4 (25)	−7 (19)	0.7 (33.3)
Mean daily minimum °C (°F)	−20 (−4)	−20 (−4)	−16 (3)	−7 (19)	−2 (28)	4 (39)	7 (45)	4 (39)	0 (32)	−5 (23)	−12 (10)	−18 (0)	−7.1 (19.2)
Source: SMHI.se

== See also ==
- Treriksrøysa – a cairn that marks the tripoint where the borders of Norway, Finland, and Russia meet.
