= Kupfermühle =

Village in Germany

Coordinates: 54°50′13″N 09°24′51″E

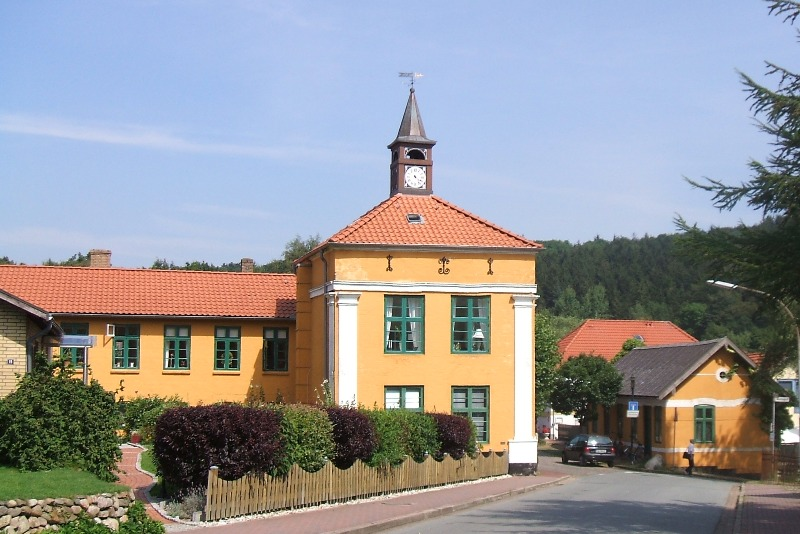
Kupfermühle / Kobbermølle

Kupfermühle (Danish: Kobbermølle, both names meaning "copper mill") is a village located north of Flensburg in Schleswig-Holstein, Germany. It is located near the Flensburg Fjord just south of the easternmost part of the Danish-German border.

== Overview ==
Kupfermühle belonged to Bov Parish until the establishment of the present border, when the rest of the parish became Danish following the 1920 Schleswig plebiscites. The village now belongs to the Gemeinde Harrislee.

Kupfermühle was the home of the first factory in Schleswig, which is the reason behind the settlement's name. The copper mill was founded by king Christian IV of Denmark and Norway in 1612 and produced finished copper products and later also products in brass. Among its products were pipes and sheet copper for copper roofs but also utensils such as buckets, pots, kettles and candlesticks. The copper production flourished in 1914, when the factory employed more than 200 workers. It went bankrupt in 1962.

Both the 17th century factory buildings and the workers' residences are preserved. The latter are known in Danish as nyboder and show great similarities with Christian's contemporary buildings in the Copenhagen district of Nyboder. The village is now home to a museum which displays many copper and brass products produced by the mill.

Many of the residents in Kupfermühle belong to the Danish minority of Southern Schleswig. A Danish school, Kobbermølle Skole, is located in the neighbouring village, Wassersleben.

== Literature ==
- Jens-Peter Hansen (1994): Kobbermøllen ved Krusaa, Foreningen til Gamle Bygningers Bevaring (in Danish)
- Kurt Andresen: Ortsentwicklung und Alltagsleben im Dorf Kupfermühle, Herausgeber: Gemeinde Harrislee (in German)
