= Bov Parish =

Parish in Aabenraa Municipality, Denmark

Bov Parish Bov Sogn
- Parish
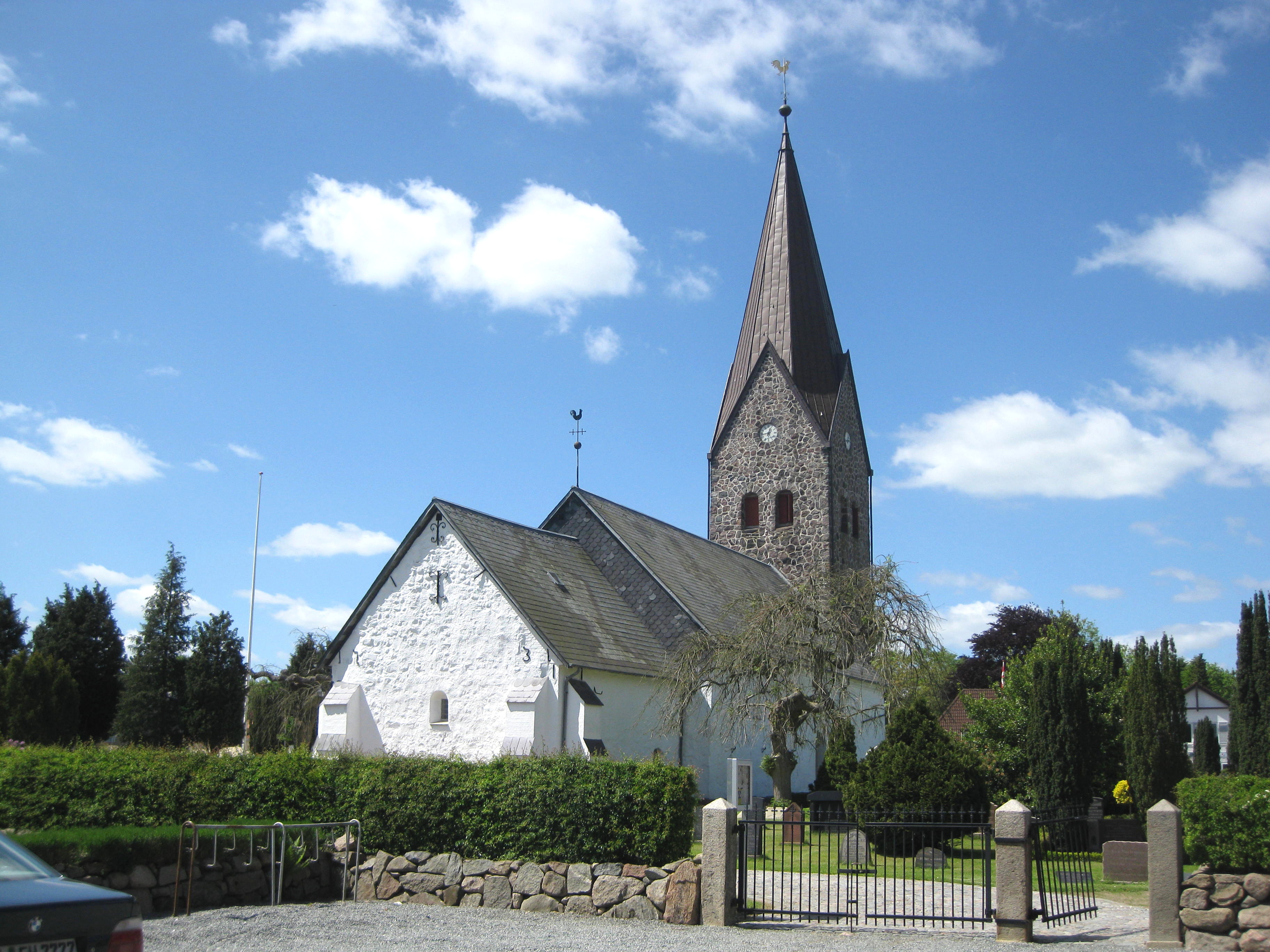
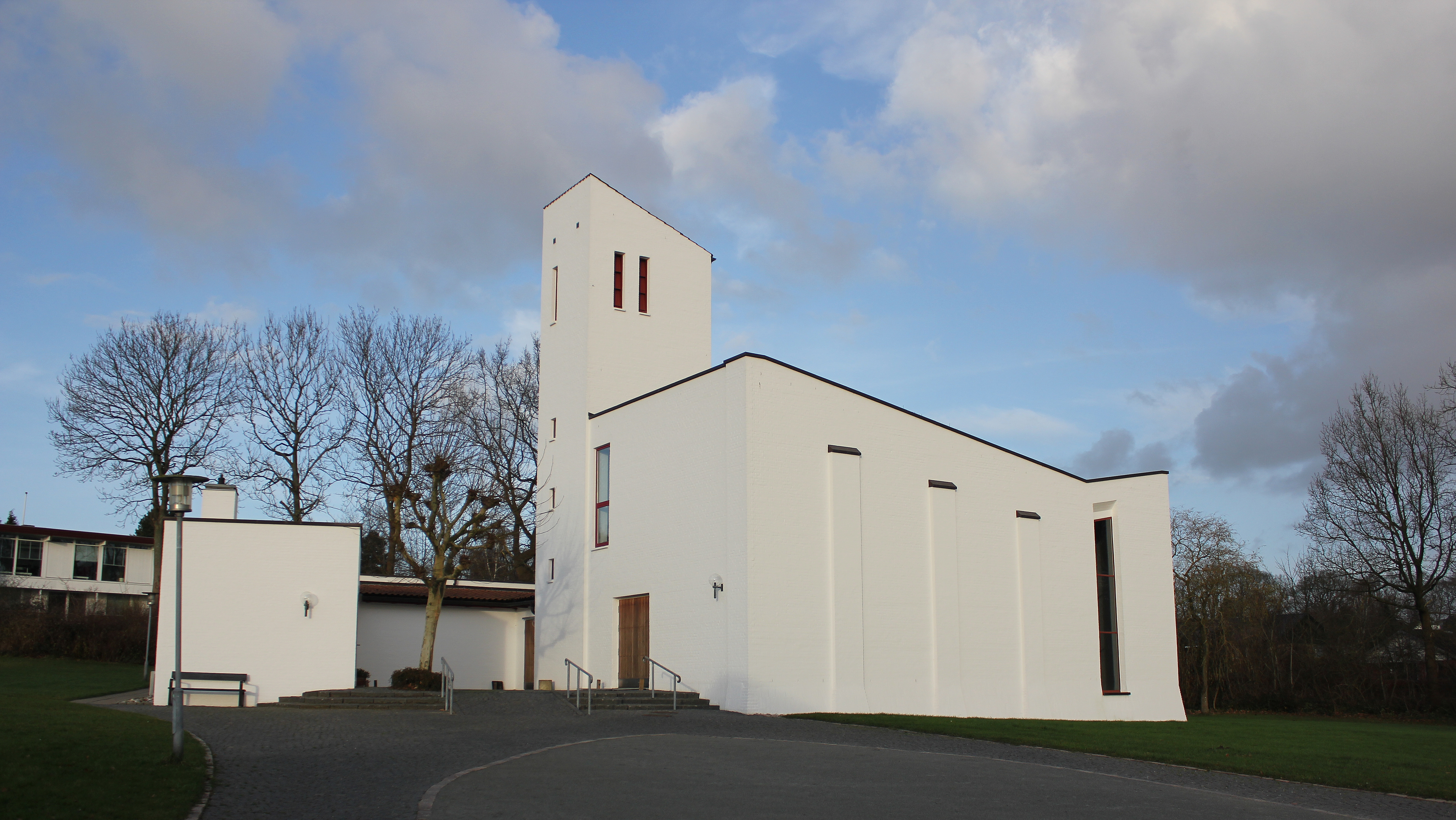
- Bov Church (left), Kollund Church (right)

- The parish within Aabenraa Municipality
- Country: Denmark
- Region: Southern Denmark
- Municipality: Aabenraa Municipality
- Diocese: Haderslev

Population (2025)
  - Total: 7,893
- Parish number: 9029

Bov Parish (Danish: Bov Sogn) is a parish in the Diocese of Haderslev in Aabenraa Municipality, Denmark.
