= Malla Strict Nature Reserve =

Nature reserve in Finland

- IUCN category Ia (strict nature reserve)
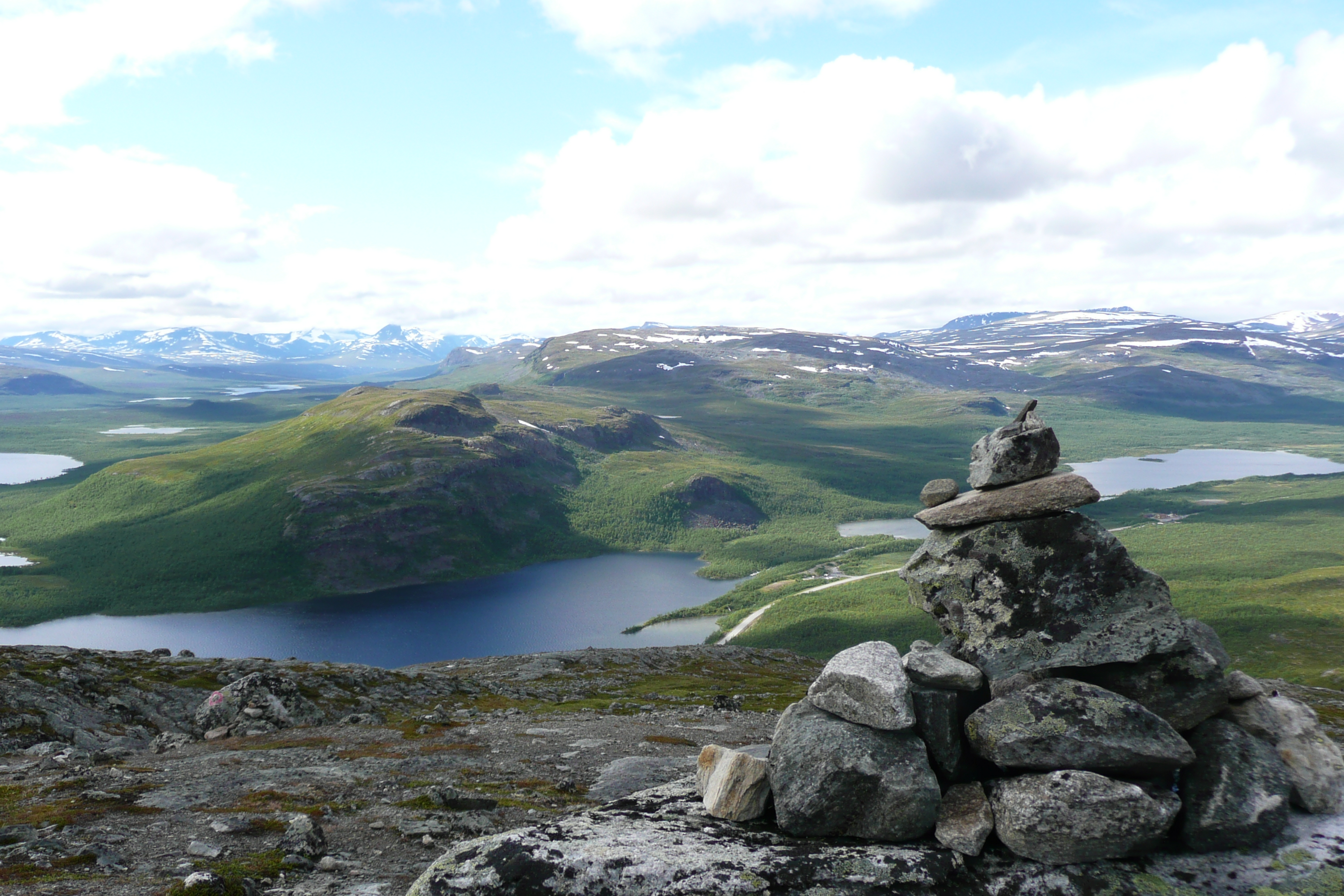
- Malla Strict Nature Reserve, seen from Saana fell across Lake Kilpisjärvi.

- Location within Finland
- Location: Lapland, Finland
- Coordinates: 69°3′56″N 20°40′16″E
- Area: 29 km^{2} (11 sq mi)
- Established: 1916
- Governing body: Metla

Malla Strict Nature Reserve (Mallan luonnonpuisto) is a strict nature reserve located in Lapland, Finland. The area has been protected since 1916 and was declared a strict nature reserve in 1938. Reindeer grazing has been prohibited since 1981.It encompasses 30 square kilometres (12 mi^{2}) and is managed by Metla. There is a trail in the park, access to this has to be separately organized. Most of the species found here can also be found on various places around Saana fell, which is accessible.
