= Storflaket =

Coordinates: 68°20′50″N 18°58′33″E

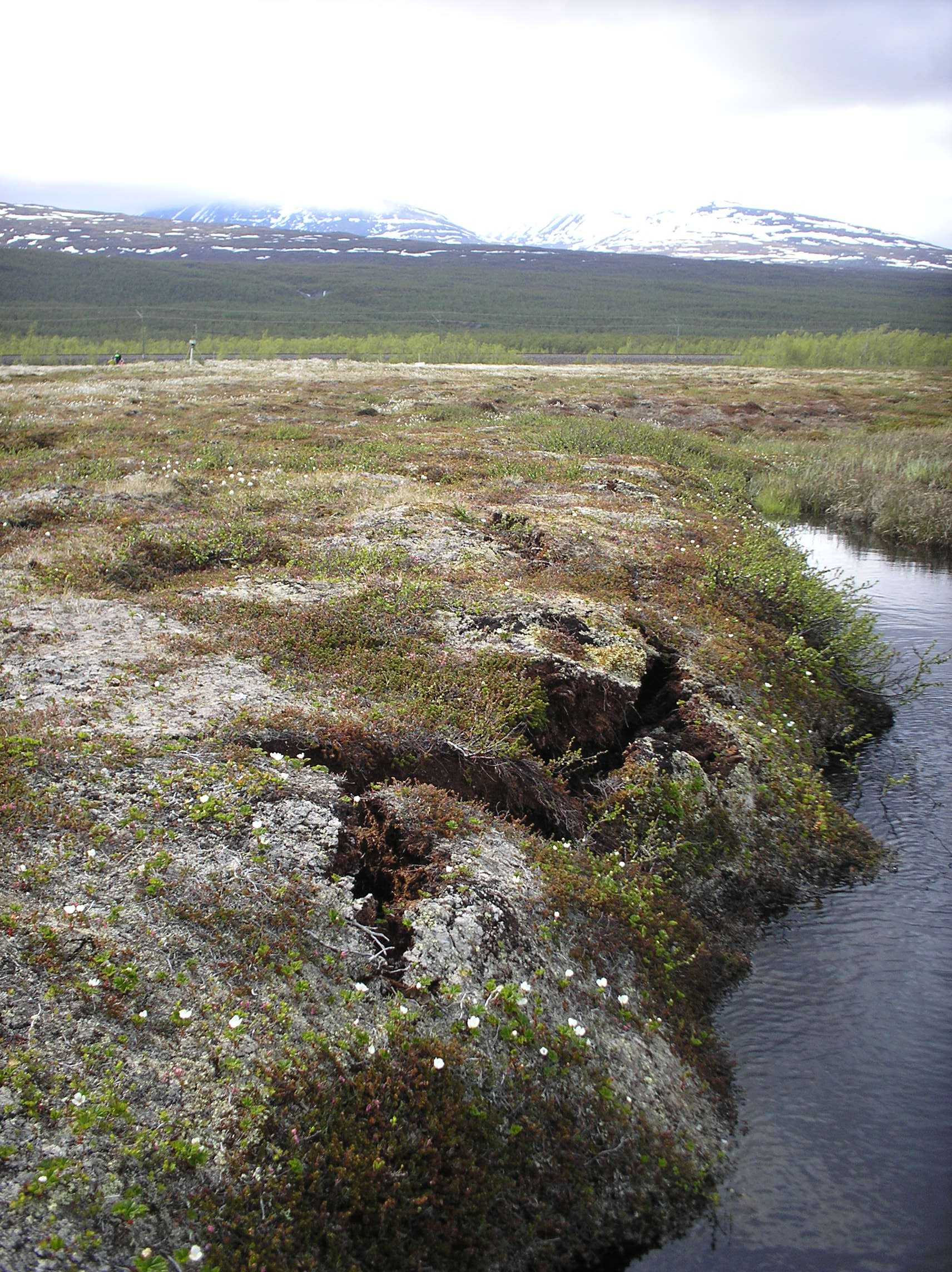
The Storflaket peat bog near Abisko in northern Sweden shows cracks at its borders due to the thawing of the permafrost.

Storflaket is a permafrost plateau peat bog on the southern shore of Torneträsk lake, in northern Sweden. Storflaket together with Stordalen is one of the main sites of studying palsas and methane emissions in Scandinavia. The bog received its name, Storflaket, due to its relatively large extent and flat surface during the buildings works of Malmbanan railroad in early 20th century.

== See also ==
- Abisko Scientific Research Station
- Stordalen
