= Abisko National Park =

National Park in Sweden

- Abisko nationalpark
- IUCN category II (national park)
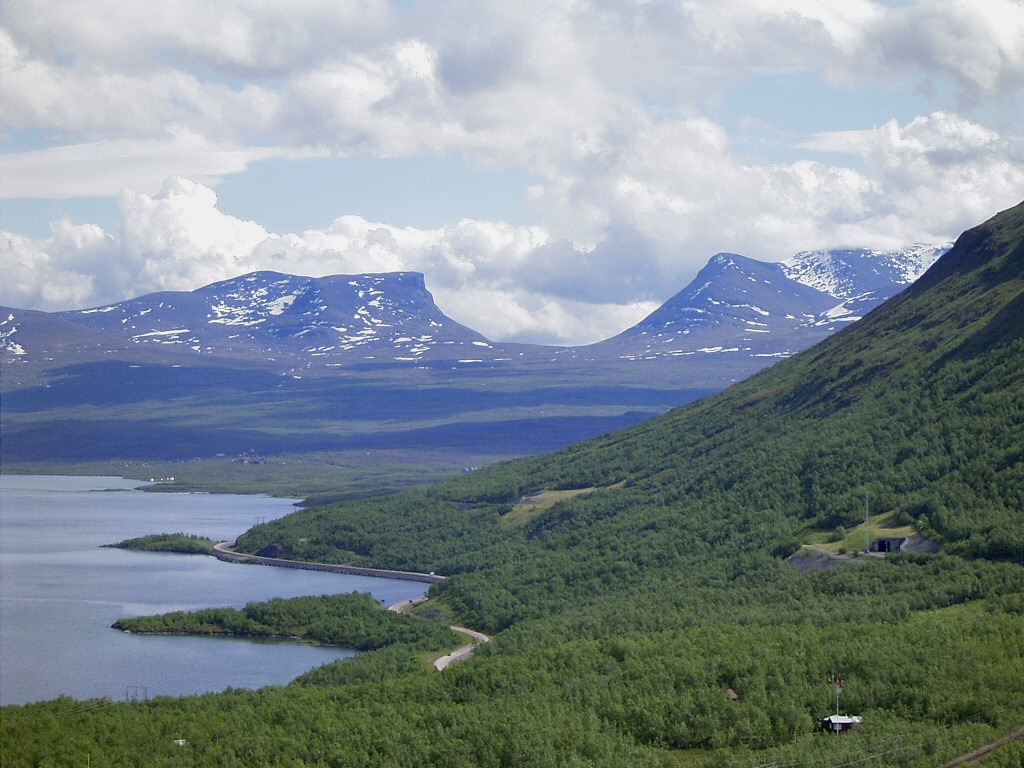
- Lapporten in the Abisko National Park
- Interactive map of Abisko National Park
- Location: Norrbotten County, Sweden
- Nearest city: Kiruna
- Coordinates: 68°19′N 18°41′E
- Area: 77 km^{2} (30 sq mi)
- Established: 1909
- Governing body: Naturvårdsverket

National parks of Sweden (clickable map)

Abisko National Park (Swedish: Abisko nationalpark) is a National Park in Sweden, established in 1909.

== Geography ==
Abisko is situated in the Swedish province of Lapland near the Norwegian border (distance approx. 37 km (23 mi) by railway), and belongs to Kiruna Municipality, Sweden's northernmost and largest municipality. It begins at the shores of Torneträsk, one of Sweden's largest lakes where the village of Abisko is located, and extends some 15 km (9.3 mi) to the south-west. It is situated about 195 km (121 mi). north of the Arctic Circle. The area of the park is 77 km^{2} (30 mi^{2})

Permafrost is common in the national park, though permafrost at lower elevations is disappearing because of global warming and increased snowfall.

== History ==
The park was proposed and established in 1909, the same year Sweden's first laws on nature conservation were created, by a group of prominent Swedish scientists, including the well-known geologist Fredrik Svenonius.

The purpose of the Abisko National Park was to "preserve an area with northern Nordic fell nature in its original condition and as a reminiscence for scientific research". The region has proved to be of much scientific interest, as is shown by the Abisko Scientific Research Station which exists to study the area. Furthermore, the national park was intended to be a prominent tourist attraction.

Abisko is also home to the Abisko Scientific Research Station, first established in 1903 approximately 31 km west of Abisko in Vassijaure. After a fire in 1910 a new station was built in its present location in Abisko in 1912 and opening in 1913. The research station was incorporated within the Royal Swedish Academy of Sciences in 1935. It is used primarily for biological, climate, ecological, environmental, and geological research and contains on-site laboratories as well as off-site field research stations.

== Tourism ==
The 440 km (270 mi) long Kungsleden hiking trail, which follows the Scandinavian mountain range, starts (or ends) at the Abisko Turiststation (consisting of a railway station of the same name and the Abisko Youth Hostel) (approx. 4 km (2.5 mi) west of the village itself) and follows through the national park. The Nordkalottruta uses trails of the park as part of its longer passage. The Abisko Turiststation, run by the Svenska Turistföreningen (STF), houses many visitors to the park and provides lodging, food, and other amenities, and is one of many similar facilities located periodically along the Kungsleden trail. The national park is known for its cross-country skiing opportunities, snowshoeing, and other winter sports (Mount Nuolja and nearby Björkliden provides backcountry skiing and freeriding opportunities). As its location is 195 km north of the Arctic Circle, summer hikers enjoy the midnight sun, while winter visitors may find the light pollution-free location ideal for viewing the aurora borealis.

== Transportation ==
Daily passenger electric trains run by SJ AB connect Stockholm with the Norwegian city of Narvik, stopping at both the Abisko village (the name of that railway station is Abisko Östra [east]) and the Abisko Turiststation. Additional regional trains provide links within the Kiruna-Narvik stretch. Abisko is also reachable by car via the highway E10 which links Kiruna and Narvik since early 1980s. Other local forms of local transportation include hiking and dog-sledding in winter. A chair-lift provides access to the summit of nearby Mt. Nuolja.

== Animals ==
There are many species of birds in the park.

Of the mammals, smaller ones like the marten, stoat, squirrel, the fell lemming and similar are common parts of the fauna. Of larger animals, the moose and reindeer are common, and moose droppings and tracks are found; however, wolverines, Arctic foxes, lynx and bears are only seen sporadically.

== Image gallery ==
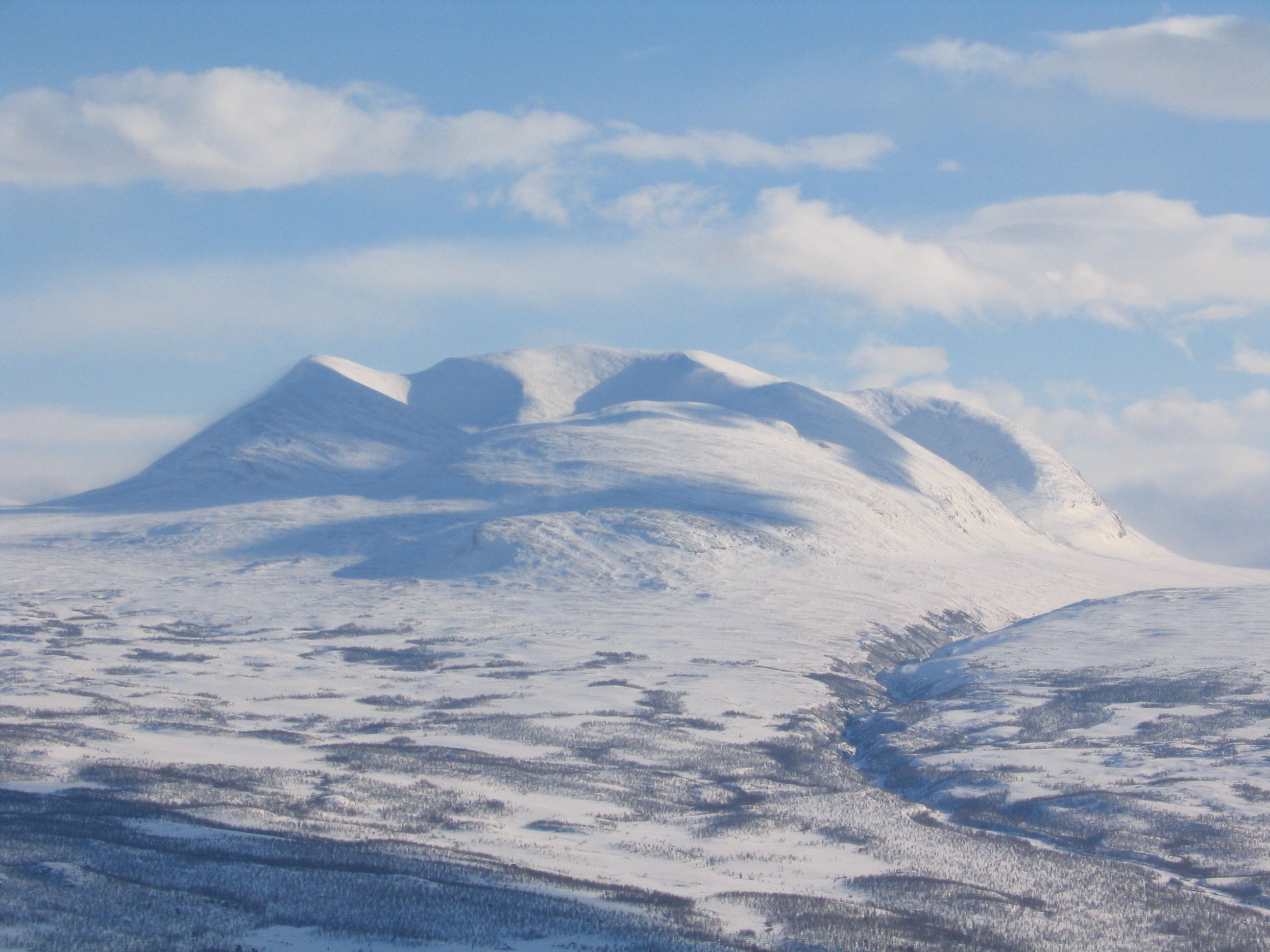
Abisko National Park in winter

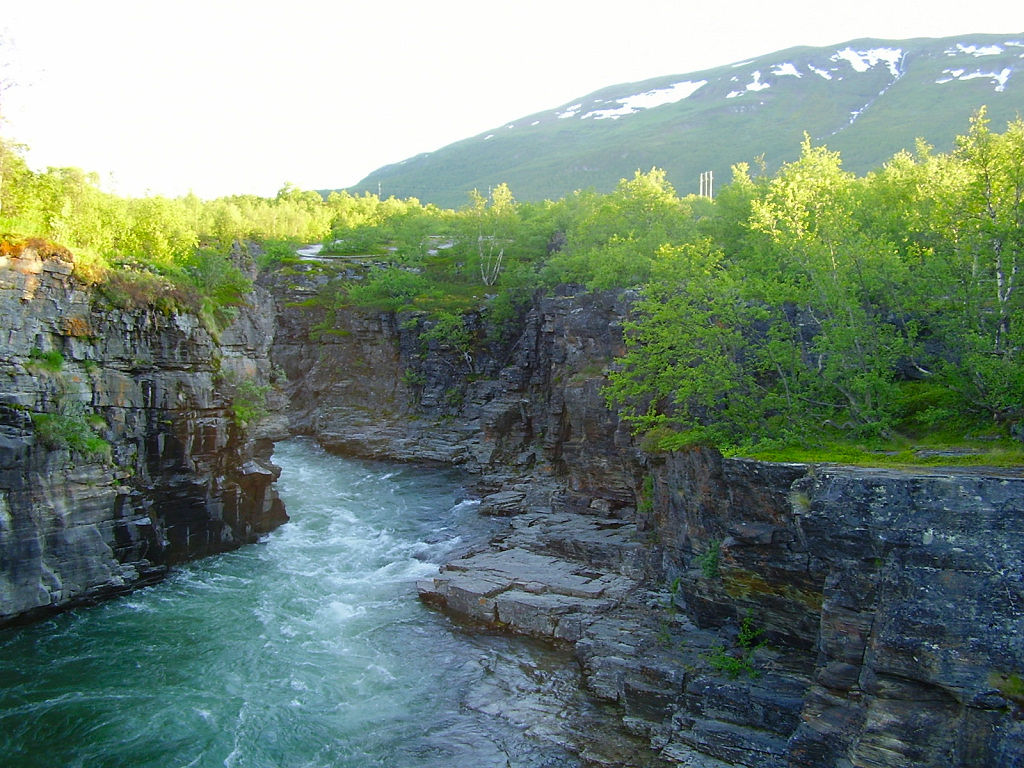
Abiskojåkka

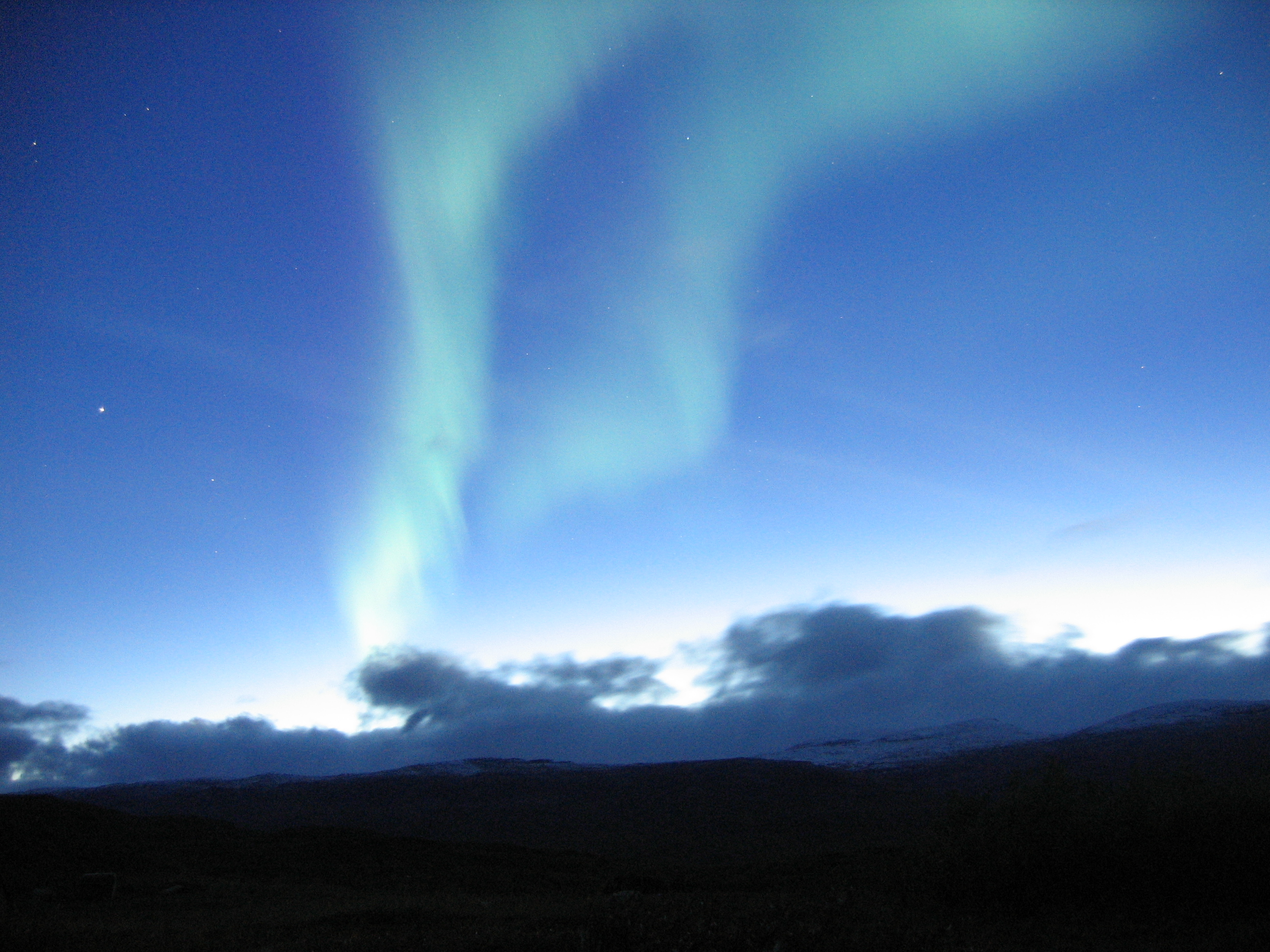
Aurora near Abisko

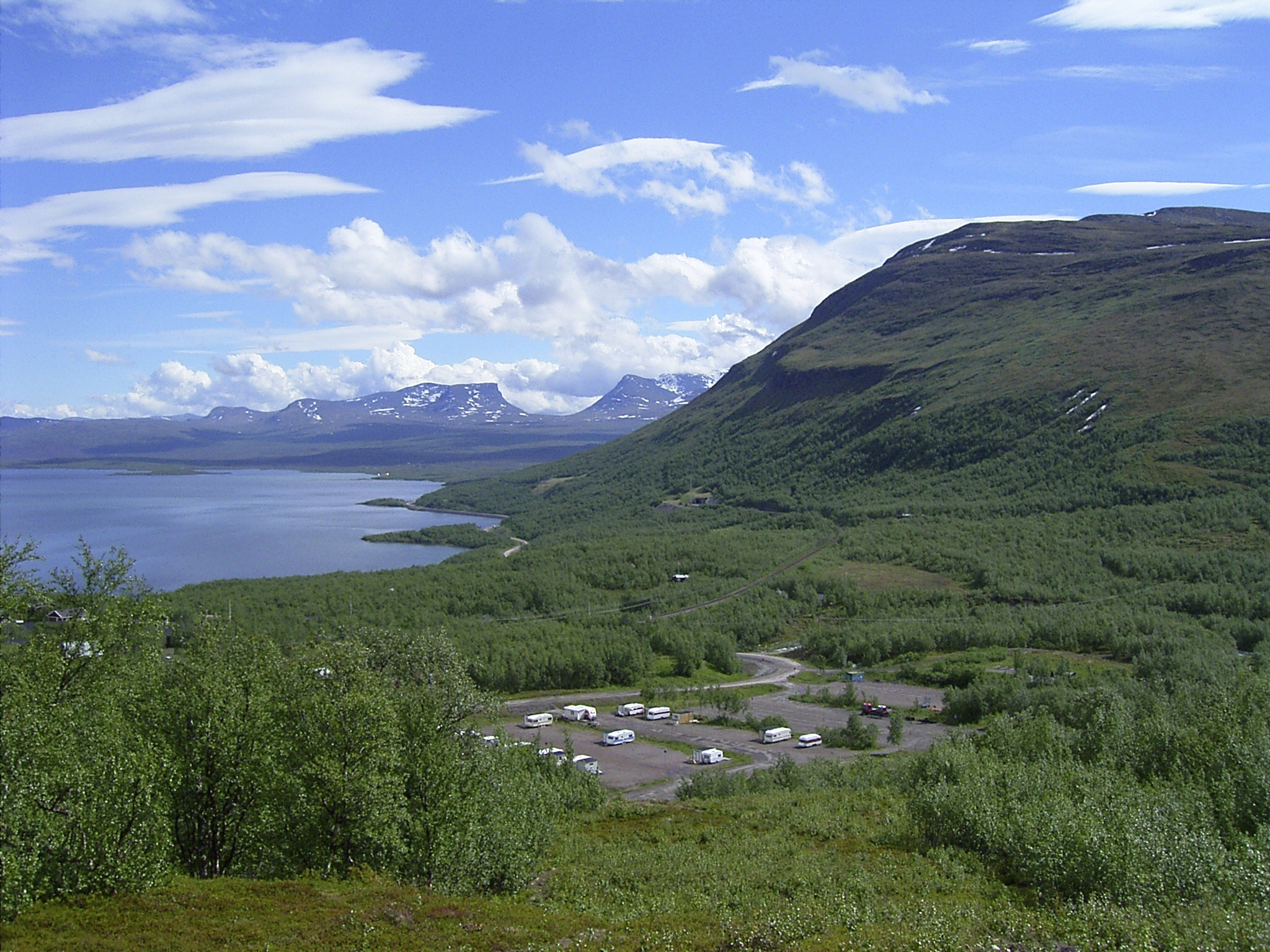
View from Björkliden with Lapporten in the background

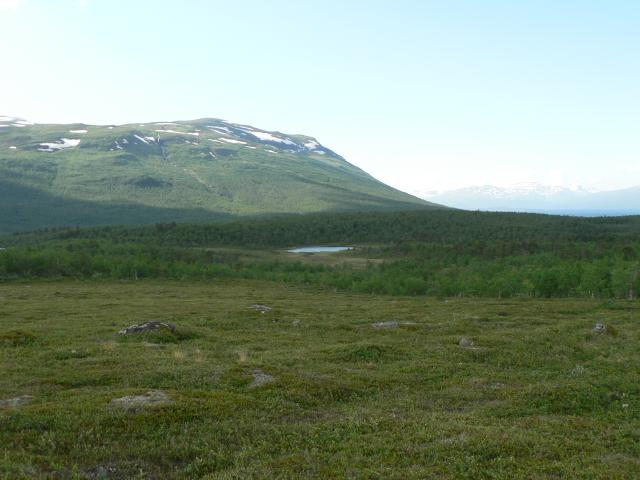
Picture of Nuolja
