= National parks in Lapland =

There are a number of national parks within Lapland Province in Finland, as well as in Swedish Lapland in the western parts of Västerbotten County and Norrbotten County. The Laponian area is a UNESCO World Heritage Site.

== Northern Lapland within Norrbotten County ==
National parks:

- Abisko
- Muddus
- Padjelanta
- Pieljekaise
- Sarek
- Stora Sjöfallet
- Vadvetjåkka

== Southern Lappland within Västerbotten County ==
National parks:

- Björnlandet

== Eastern Lappland within Lapland Province ==
National parks:

- Pyhä-Luosto National Park
- Lemmenjoki National Park
- Pallas-Yllästunturi National Park
- Urho Kekkonen National Park

== See also ==
- Lappmarken
