= Russula nuoljae =

Scientific classification
- Domain: Eukaryota
- Kingdom: Fungi
- Division: Basidiomycota
- Class: Agaricomycetes
- Order: Russulales
- Family: Russulaceae
- Genus: Russula
- Species: R. nuoljae

Binomial name
- Russula nuoljae Kühner

Species of fungus

Russula nuoljae is an agaricoid fungus currently typed by a single fruiting body, found in Nuolja in Northern Sweden. Other specimens have been found, mainly in mountainous birch forests in Scandinavia. Specimens have also been identified from Northern Alberta, although exclusively through DNA database matches.

R. nuoljae always exemplifies a white stem. Spores are ochre-coloured, although the gills may appear white on younger mushroom caps. The caps may grow to 110 mm in diameter.
