= Stordalen Mire =

Peatland in Sweden

Coordinates: 68°21′N 19°20′E

Stordalen Mire (elevation 351 m) is a mire which lies in the subarctic region in northernmost Sweden. It is 10 km east of the town of Abisko close to Lake Torneträsk. It is a 25 ha palsa mire, which is common in the discontinuous permafrost zone. The mire has two major topographical features: elevated palsas and depressions. The palsas are dry, ombrotrophic plateaus (or hummocks) with permafrost cores that raise the peat surface above its surroundings that is the wet minerotrophic depressions, largely permafrost free and water saturated. The small-scale topography is often very patchy in its structure, creating an environment where localities nearby each other have distinct differences in moisture, permafrost and nutrient status, which creates differences in vegetation types. Of these subhabitats the vegetation in the dry parts consists mainly of mosses, lichens and dwarf shrubs, whereas the wet parts are dominated by sphagnum or tall graminoids. A peat layer up to 3 m deep covers most of the area and is an indication of a net carbon accumulation over the past 5000 years. In the areas underlying by permafrost the active layer reaches a thickness of about 60 cm in the late summer. The mire experiences thermokarst erosion, with the ongoing permafrost thawing that leads to degradation and collapse of the palsa structure, converting it into the wetter surface types. To the east the mire is bordered by the shallow Lake Villasjön (max depth 1.3 m) whereas it is in general largely surrounded by mountain birch forest.

In 2018 Nature journal published a study which used metagenomics and genome binning to assemble 1,529 metagenome-assembled genomes from 214 samples from a permafrost thaw gradient from Stordalen mire.
