= Lapland (Sweden) =

Historical province of Sweden

Coordinates: 65°55′44″N 16°44′35″E

- Historical province
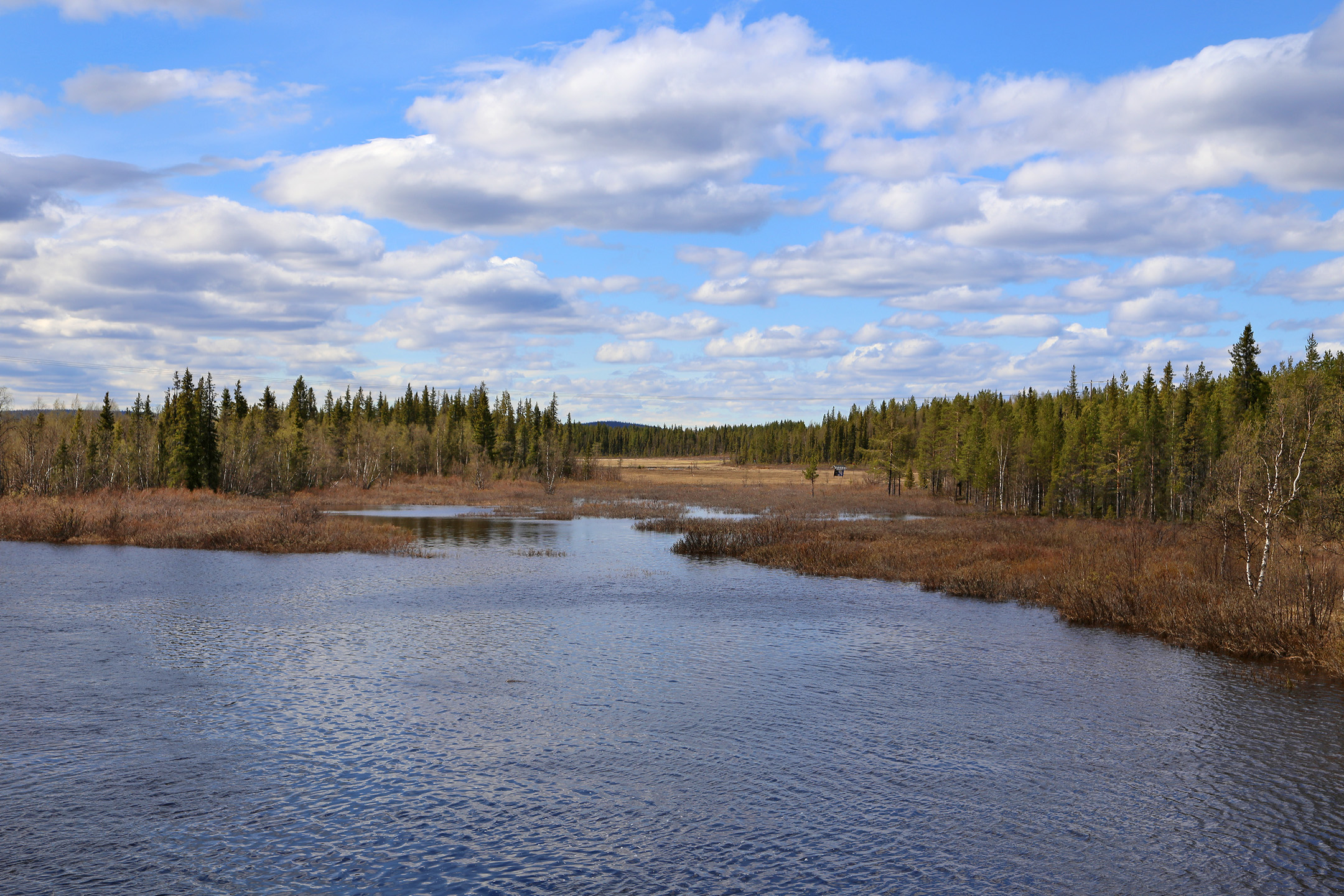

- Flag Coat of arms

- Country: Sweden
- Land: Norrland
- Counties: Västerbotten, Norrbotten, Jämtland

Area
  - Total: 109,702 km^{2} (42,356 sq mi)

Population (31 December 2023)
  - Total: 87,744
  - Density: 0.79984/km^{2} (2.0716/sq mi)

Ethnicity
  - Language: Swedish, Sami, Meänkieli

Culture
  - Flower: Mountain avens
  - Animal: Arctic fox, lynx, reindeer
  - Bird: Bluethroat
  - Fish: Salvelinus
- Time zone: UTC+1 (CET)
  - Summer (DST): UTC+2 (CEST)

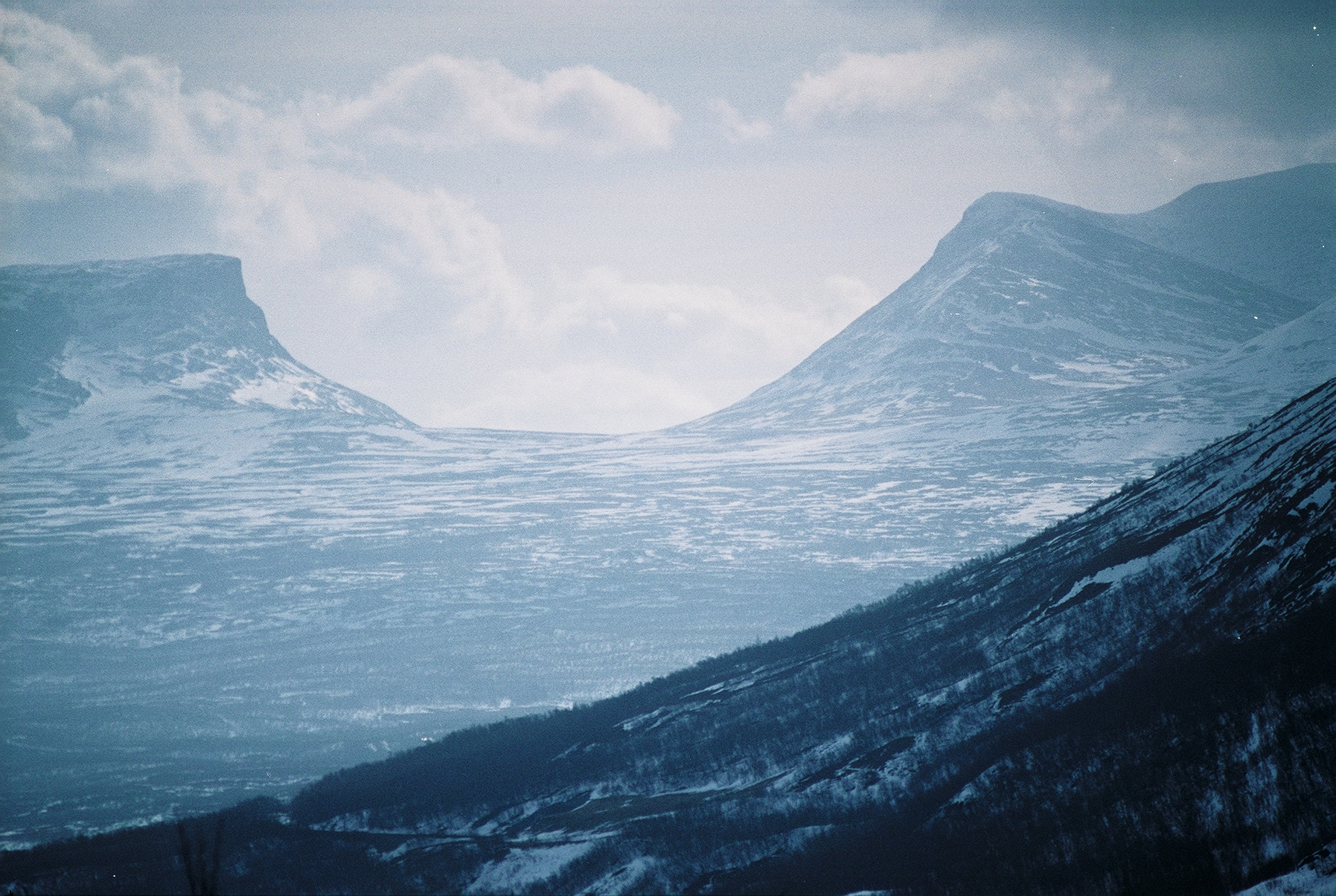
The Lapporten mountain pass

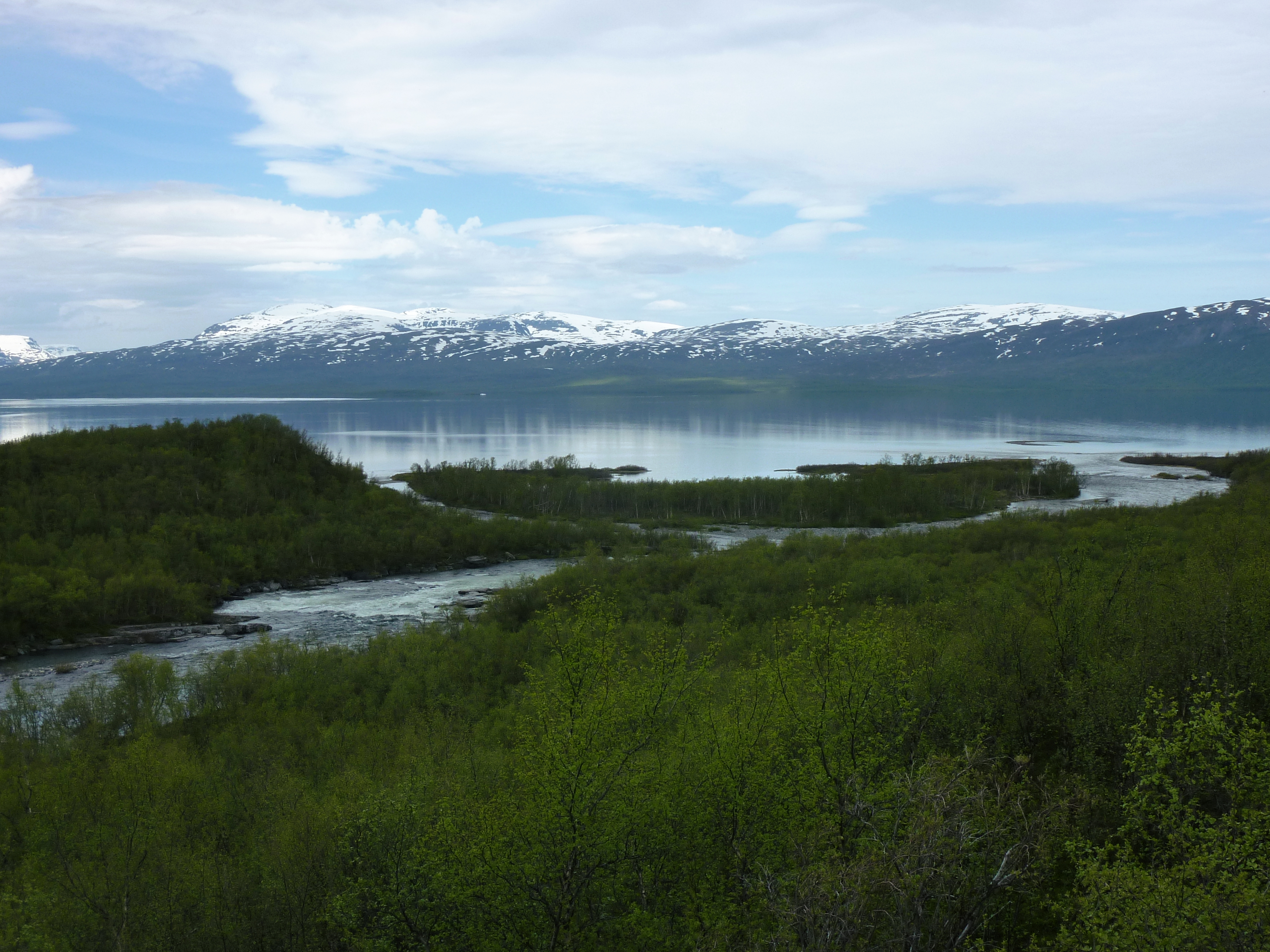
Abiskojåkka river and Torneträsk lake

Lapland, also known by its Swedish name Lappland, is the largest and northernmost province of Sweden. It borders the Swedish provinces of Jämtland, Ångermanland, Västerbotten, and Norrbotten, as well as Norway and Finland. Nearly a quarter of Sweden's land area is in Lapland.

The historical province of Lapland originally extended further eastward. However, in 1809 the Russian Empire annexed the eastern part of Sweden and formed the Grand Duchy of Finland in that territory. This effectively split Lapland into a Swedish part and a Finnish part, both of which still exist today. Swedish Lapland primarily consists of the inland parts of Västerbotten County in the south and Norrbotten County in the north. It has the coldest climates of Sweden, with vast seasonal differences caused by the high latitudes and the inland location.

== Name ==
Due to the perception of Lapp as being derogatory towards Sámi people, there is a tendency to avoid the label Lapland altogether in favor of talking about its constituent Västerbotten and Norrbotten counties instead. Since the mid-1990s, the Sámi cultural area that was traditionally known as Lapland is usually referred to as Sápmi.

== History ==
The history of Lapland is in many ways connected to the history of Norrbotten County and Västerbotten County, since Lapland is a historic region connected to these counties. During the Middle Ages, Norrbotten/Lapland was considered a no man's land. The area was in fact populated by nomadic Sámi people, but the region became increasingly settled by Swedish, Finnish and Norwegian settlers—especially along the coasts and large rivers. From the Middle Ages on, the Swedish kings tried to colonise and Christianise the area using settlers from what is now Finland and southern Sweden. Today, despite large-scale assimilation into the dominant Swedish culture, Finnish and Sámi minorities continue to maintain their cultures and identities.

Despite independent cultural presence, religious beliefs were subject to conversion in the 17th and 18th centuries resulting in Laplanders generally leaving their original shamanism and converting to Lutheranism. Since the 19th century, Lapland has been particularly characterised by Laestadian Lutheranism.

During the industrialization of Sweden in the late-19th century, natural resources (hydroelectricity, timber and minerals) from Lapland and surrounding provinces played a key role. Mining, forestry and hydroelectric power are the backbone of the local economy, together with municipal services. The unemployment has however been relatively high for several decades and many young people leave for the larger cities by the coast or in southern Sweden.

== Geography ==
Located in Sweden, Lapland is known for containing the Vindelfjällen Nature Reserve, one of the largest nature reserves in Sweden. Other parts of Lapland have been named a UNESCO World Heritage Site, the Laponian area, and the province contains some of the oldest and most spectacular national parks of northern Europe, e.g. Sarek National Park, established in 1909. Lapland has an area of 109,702 square km (c. 42,300 sq miles), larger than Austria and almost equal to Portugal. Its land area is also larger than the Benelux countries combined, being more than double the size of Switzerland and quite a bit larger than the island of Ireland.

=== National parks ===
- Abisko
- Björnlandet
- Muddus
- Padjelanta
- Sarek
- Stora Sjöfallet
- Vadvetjåkka

== Administration ==
The traditional provinces of Sweden serve no administrative or political purposes but are cultural and historical entities. Administratively, Lapland constitutes the western part of two counties of Sweden, Norrbotten County in the north and Västerbotten County in the south. In contrast to most other areas of Sweden, there is more of an identification with the counties rather than to provinces. Thus, most people in these counties refer to the entire county, including the areas in Lapland, when they say 'Norrbotten' or 'Västerbotten'.

Citizens of Sámi descent are eligible to stand and vote in elections for the Swedish Sámi Parliament, which is the case with Sámi people elsewhere in Sweden as well. The North Sámi language has an official minority status in Kiruna Municipality, Gällivare Municipality, Jokkmokk Municipality and Arjeplog Municipality.

The following municipalities have their seats in Lapland:

- Arjeplog
- Arvidsjaur
- Dorotea
- Gällivare
- Jokkmokk
- Kiruna
- Lycksele
- Malå
- Sorsele
- Storuman
- Vilhelmina
- Åsele

== Population ==
As of 31 December 2017, the population of Swedish Lapland is 91,333. The largest cities are Kiruna (Northern Sami: Giron, Finnish: Kiiruna, Meänkieli: Kieruna) with 23,178 inhabitants, Gällivare with 18,123 inhabitants and Lycksele with 12,177 inhabitants.

In Norrbotten County:

- Kiruna (23,178)
- Gällivare (18,123)
- Jokkmokk (5,072)
- Arjeplog (2,887)
- Arvidsjaur (6,471)

In Västerbotten County:

- Lycksele (12,177)
- Vilhelmina (6,829)
- Storuman (5,943)
- Malå (3,109)
- Åsele (2,814)
- Dorotea (2,740)
- Sorsele (2,516)

== Heraldry ==
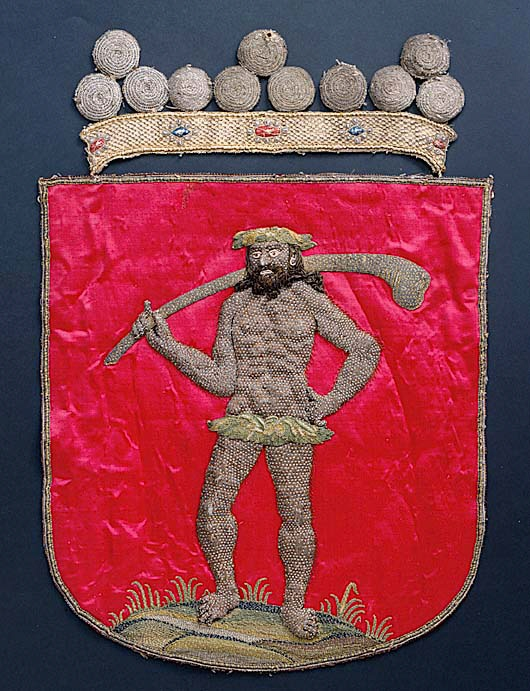
Embroidered coat of arms from the funeral of Charles X Gustav in 1660, crowned with a count's coronet

The blazon, the formal description of Lapland's coat of arms, reads: "Argent, a Wildman statant Gules wrapped with birch leaves Vert on the head and around the waist holding a Club Or in dexter over the shoulder."

The wildman wielding a club as heraldic symbol of Lapland first appeared at the coronation of Charles IX of Sweden in 1607, then at the same king's burial in 1611. The wildman's red skin color was standardized only in 1949; prior to that, various shades, including natural skin tones, were used, particularly in the early 20th century. The coat of arms of Finnish Lapland features the same motif, though in different colors. The wildman, though unusual in heraldry, is an old symbol of the uncivilised north and appeared in books and woodcuts of the 16th century.

During the Vasa period, Lapland was formally designated as a county (grevskap), a status symbolized by the count's coronet placed atop its coat of arms. On 18 January 1884 the Privy Council gave all provinces the right of use to a ducal coronet in their heraldic arms.

== Climate ==
Lapland has a subarctic climate in its lower areas, whereas a polar variety can be found in Tarfala, where the average high for the warmest month of the year (July) is lower than 10 °C (50 °F) in mean temperatures. The southern parts of the province are significantly milder than the northern, due to the vast geographical differences. However, since Lapland is all made up of inland areas, maritime moderation is less significant than in the counties' coastal areas and in neighbouring Norway, resulting in harsh winters. Southern areas at a lower elevation such as Lycksele also have relatively warm summers. Due to the Arctic Circle, the northern areas of the province experience midnight sun and a moderate polar night with some civil twilight during opposite sides of the year.

== Sports ==
Football in the province is administered by Norrbottens Fotbollförbund and Västerbottens Fotbollförbund.

== Marketing ==
An EU-subsidised government tourism marketing organisation aiming to promote tourism in Northern Sweden has taken the brand name "Swedish Lapland". This name also covers towns in the coastal area of Gulf of Bothnia as well as the border area to Finland though neither areas are a part of the geographical province Swedish Lapland, rather the Lapland area as a whole in northern Scandinavia.

== National minorities ==
Lapland is home to two prominent national minorities: the Sámi people and the Tornedalians. The Tornedalians are Finnish speakers who remained within the Swedish borders following the division of historical Lapland after the Finnish War of 1809. As a result of the Industrial Revolution and the separation of Swedish part of Torne Valley from the Grand Duchy of Finland, the Tornedalian language (Meänkieli) began incorporating an increasing number of Swedish loanwords. This divergence meant that Tornedalians did not participate in the standardization process of Finnish, and they retained older Swedish loanwords that later disappeared from Finnish due to the language strife and Fennoman movement in Finland. Today, the standardization of Meänkieli has developed independently from Standard Finnish. Although Meänkieli and Finnish remain largely mutually intelligible, there is ongoing debate about whether Meänkieli should be classified as a distinct language or a dialect of Finnish.

== See also ==
- National parks in Lapland
