= Abisko Scientific Research Station =

Research station in Sweden

Coordinates: 68.3544°N 18.8156°E

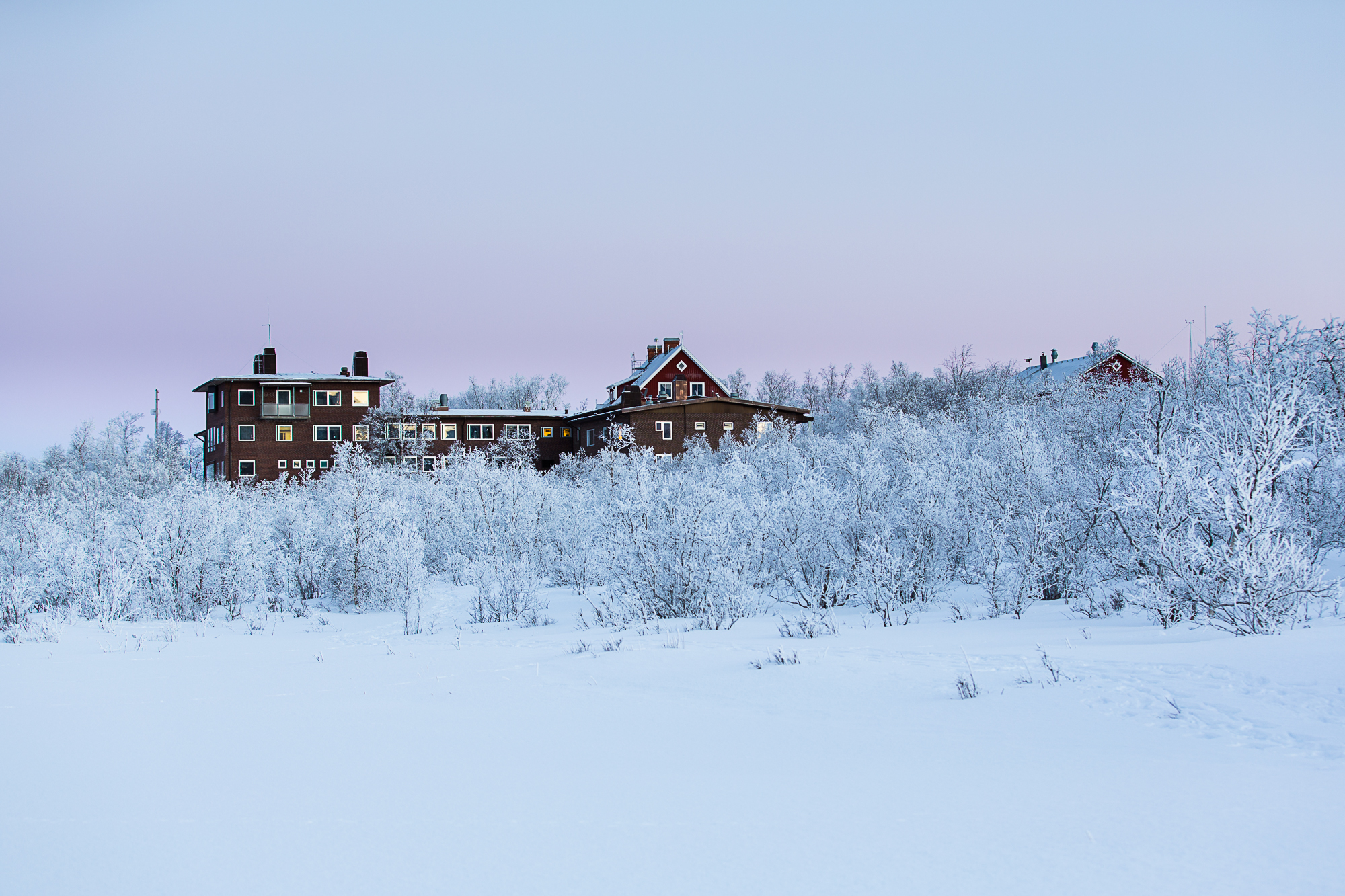
- ANS in the winter
- Predecessor: Vassijaure naturvetenskapliga station
- Formation: 1903; 123 years ago
- Location: Abisko
- Region served: Norrbotten, Arctic
- Official language: Swedish, English
- Head of Department of Terrestrial Research: Margareta Johansson
- Parent organization: Swedish Polar Research Secretariat
- Affiliations: University of the Arctic
- Staff: 12
- Website: polar.se/en/abisko-naturvetenskapliga-station/

The Abisko Scientific Research Station (ANS) is a field research station managed by the Swedish Polar Research Secretariat. Situated on the south shore of Lake Torneträsk, it lies at the edge of the Abisko National Park. The station conducts ecological, geological, geomorphological and meteorological research in subarctic environments and each year about 500 scientists visit from all over the world. The varied geological, topographical and climatic conditions of the area allow it to be inhabited by a range of flora and fauna. These features, which have caused the area to be given National Park status, also make it an important place for scientific research, particularly of alpine and subalpine ecosystems.

== The station ==
The first proper field station to be established in the area dates back to 1903, however the official station has only been affiliated with the Royal Swedish Academy of Sciences since 1935. The station holds meteorological datasets extending back to 1913, including air and soil temperature, precipitation and UV radiation. The research station has been the site of many long-term experiments investigating climate change impacts and is part of the International Tundra Experiment (ITEX) which is an international collaboration investigating the effects of environmental change on plants in circumpolar ecosystems. Since December 2010 the station is managed by the Swedish Polar Research Secretariat.

The research station today consists of laboratories and general workrooms containing a variety of scientific equipment, and also of various 'outposts' where research is carried out in situ. It is used for research, teaching and meetings, and has a large collection of scientific books and papers available on site.

== Current research ==
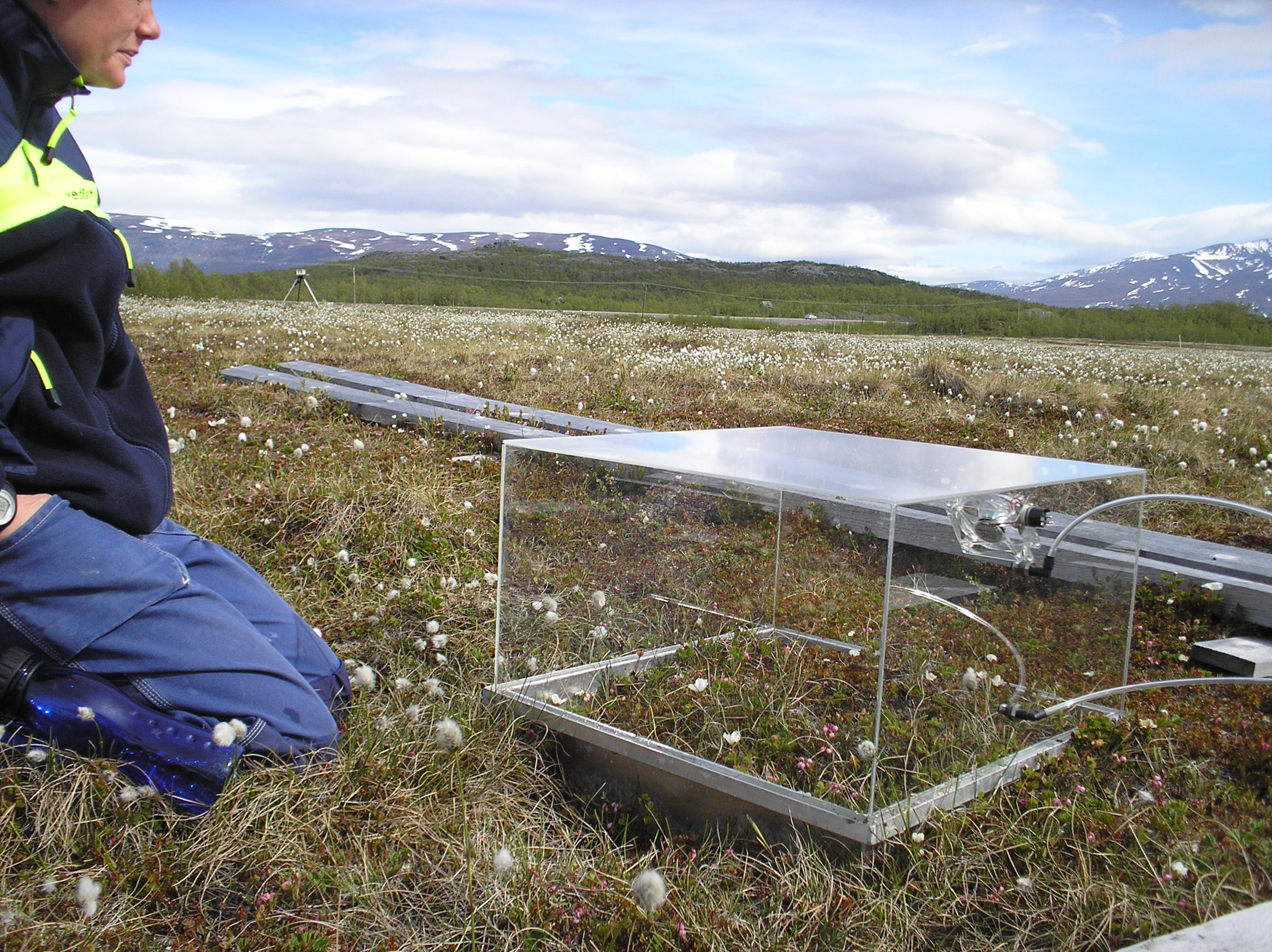
PMMA chambers used to measure methane and CO_{2} emissions in Storflaket peat bog near Abisko.

Though many research projects are carried out at the station regarding geography and biology in general, particular emphasis is placed on meteorology and plant ecology. Many of these projects overlap as the station hosts research into climate change in the region and the resulting changes to plant communities. The Abisko Scientific Research Station served as base for early high mountain permafrost studies in northern Sweden. A summary of these studies appeared in 1986 in Geografiska Annaler. In recent years, research has included work on permafrost degradation, the importance of winter climate change and tree-line dynamics.

Abisko Scientific Research Station is a member of the University of the Arctic. UArctic is an international cooperative network based in the Circumpolar Arctic region, consisting of more than 200 universities, colleges, and other organizations with an interest in promoting education and research in the Arctic region.

== See also ==
- List of research stations in the Arctic
