= Abiskojokk =

River in Lappland, Sweden

Abiskojokk Abiskojåkka, Ábeskoeatnu
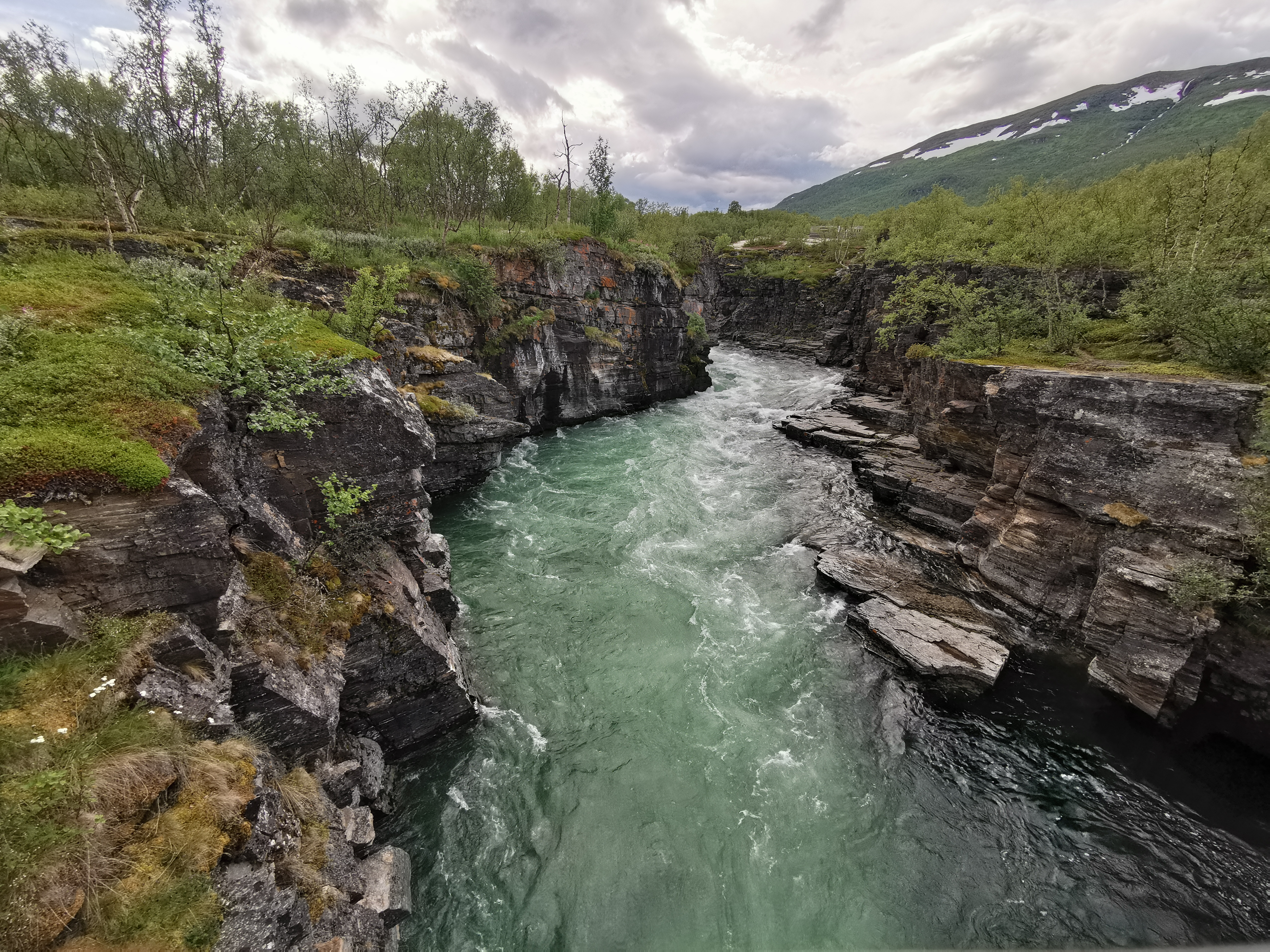

Location
- Country: Sweden
- County: Norrbotten
- Municipality: Kiruna

Physical characteristics
- Mouth: Torneträsk
  - coordinates: 68°22′N 18°47′E
- Length: 40 km (25 mi)
- Basin size: 544 km^{2} (210 sq mi)

Abiskojokk or Abiskojåkka (Northern Sami: Ábeskoeatnu) is a river in the Abisko National Park in northern Sweden. The upper part of the river is called Kamajokk or Kamajåkka.

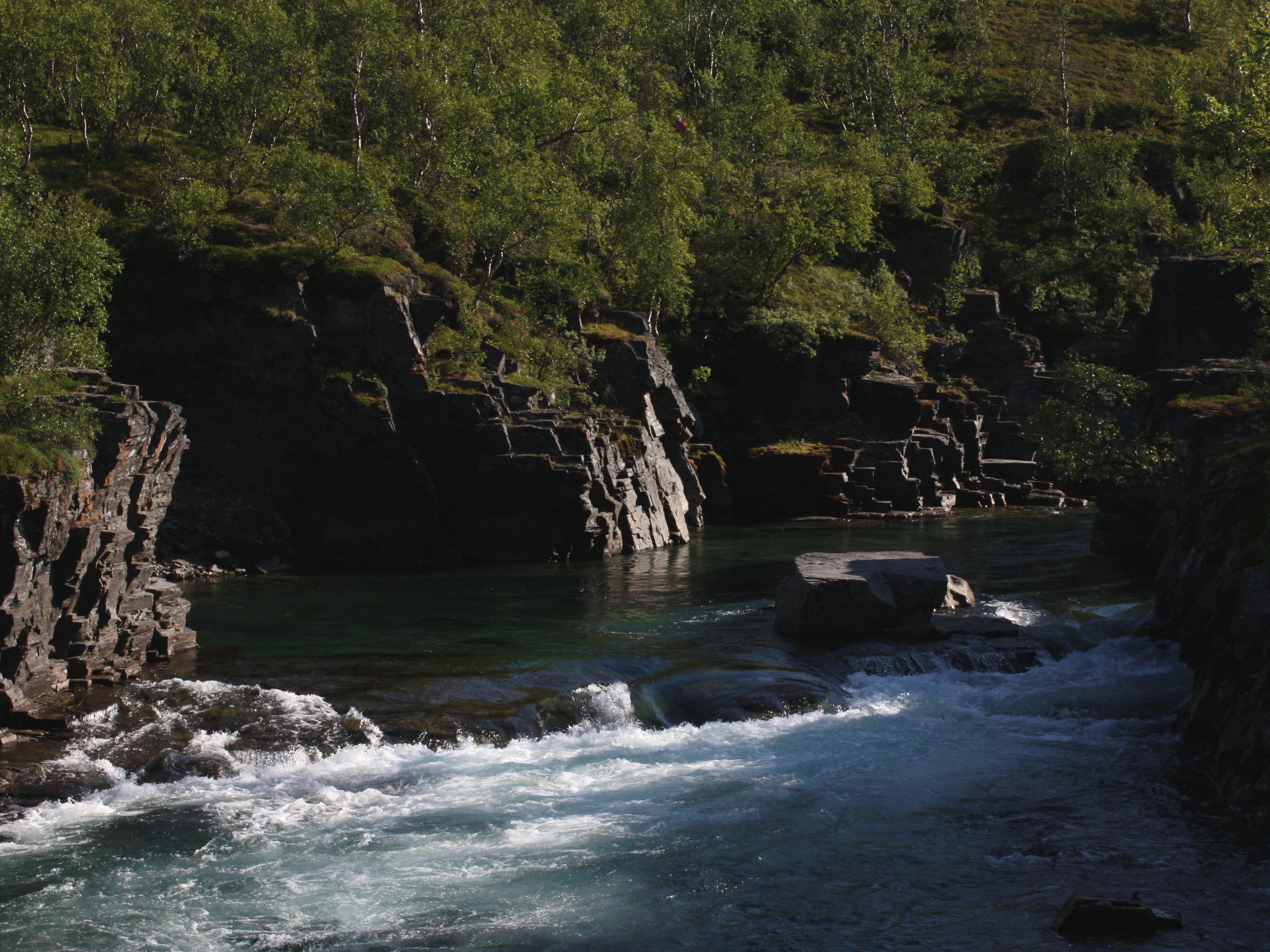
Abiskojokk in August 2008

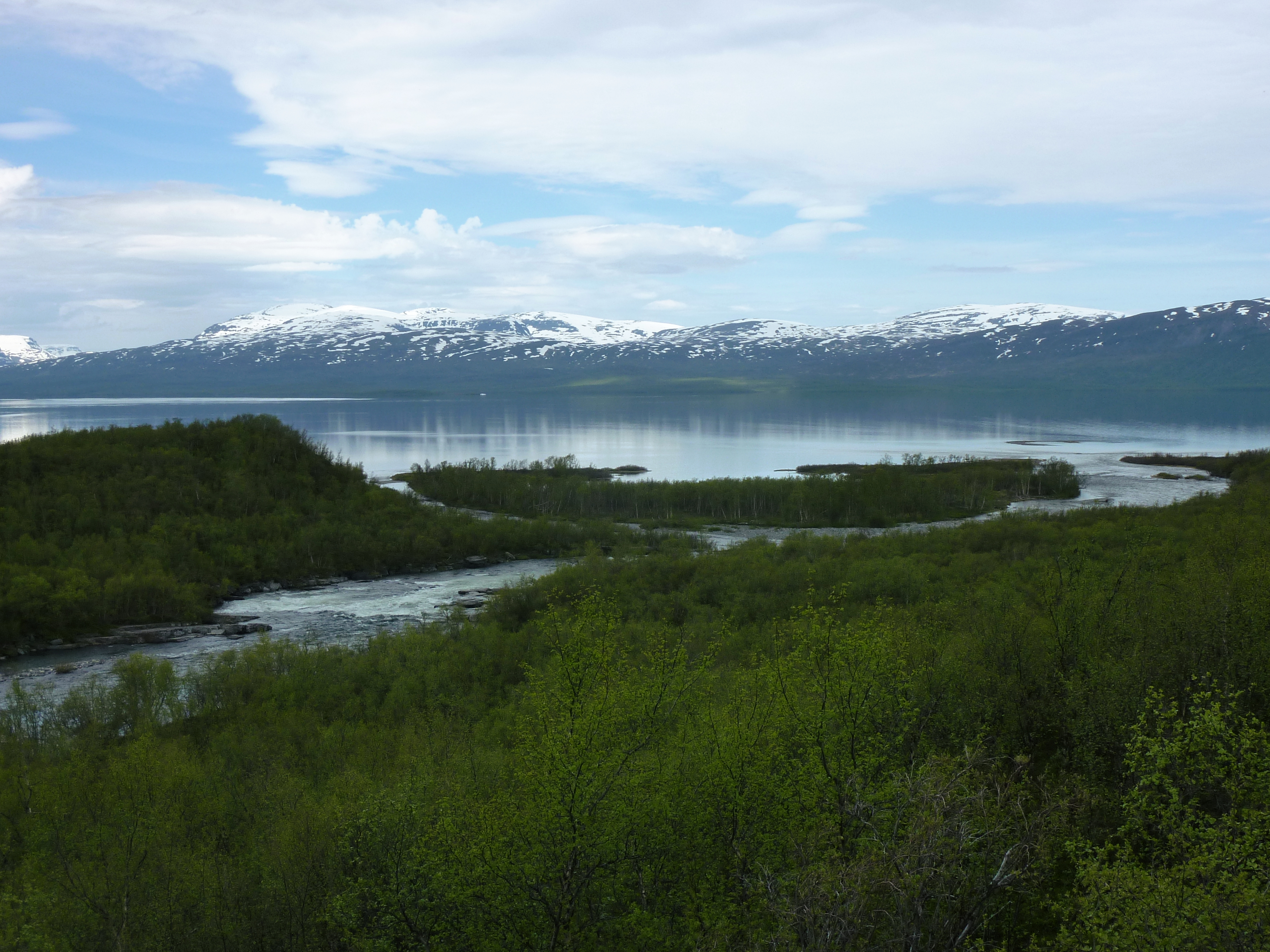
Abiskojåkka river and Torneträsk lake (Abisko national park) in June
