= Nuolja =

Field research site in Sweden

Coordinates: 68°22′N 18°42′E

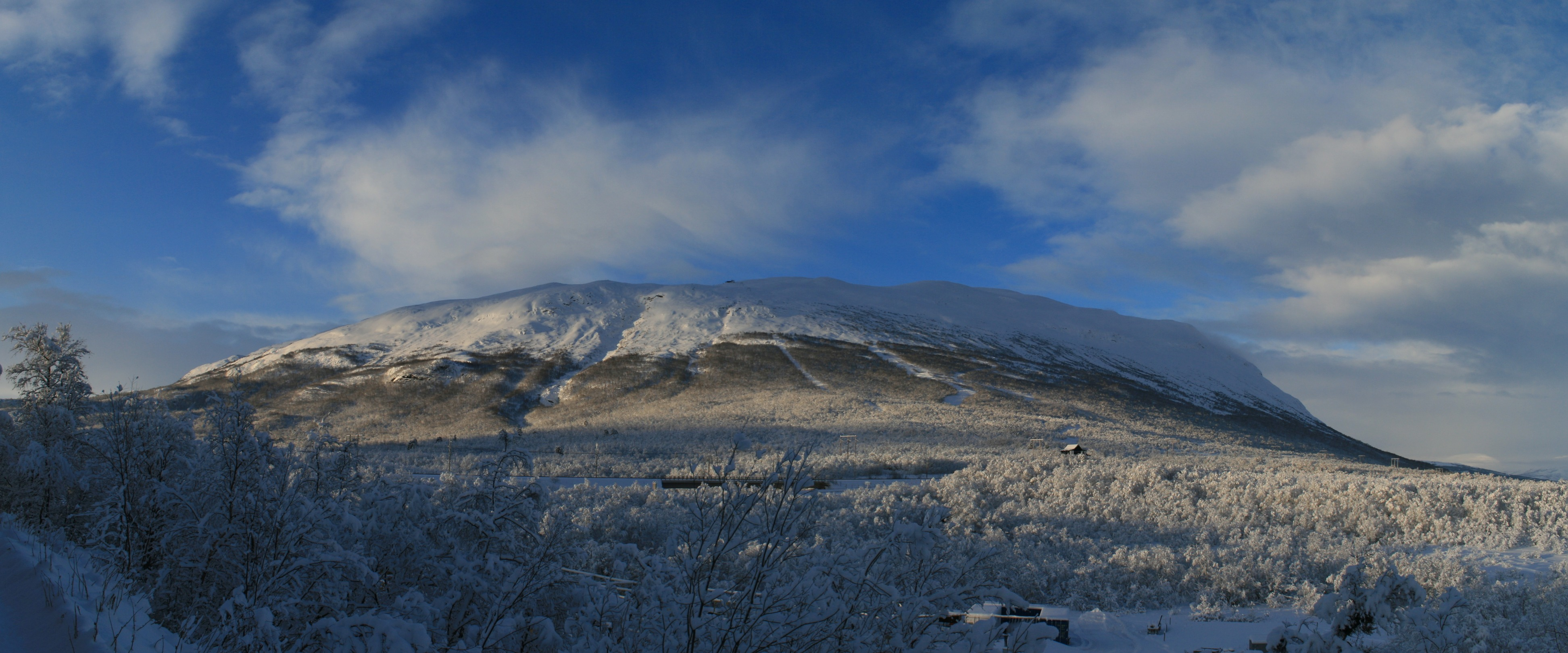
Panorama of Mt Nuola (Njullá)

Nuolja, also known as Njulla, is a field research site in Sweden that stretches across Mt. Njulla. With the mountain to the east, the village of Abisko to the south, and bordering Lake Torneträsk, this is a varied-habitat field site. Mountain birch forests are one of the main appeals of this research site.

The name "Nuolja" may also refer specifically to a 12 km hiking trail on Mt. Njulla, Sweden.

== History ==
Nuolja was founded in 1917 by botanist Thore E. Fries, who published a lengthy report in 1925 titled "Ecological and Phenological Observations at Abisko Over the Years". Fries hiked up the mountain and down again some 150 times, helping set the location of the future field site, assessing how snow melt dates affected plant phenology.

== Research ==
Nuolja serves as a key climate change assessment site, echoing the original research done by Thore. E. Fries in 1917. In 2017, 100 years after his work, researchers began re-assessing how climate change has affected both snow melt and plant phenology. This work will be able to be directly compared to Fries' publication. There are also several tree-line studies occurring, and a research project assessing alpine bee populations and the flowering plants they visit.

A citizen science project also launched in 2017, asking visitors to the area to collect field data on approximate 20 key plant species. By submitting sightings and photographs, researchers will be able to assess a broader and more numerous set of samples, across a variety of climate events and elevations. The trail, opened in June 2017, will be able to be accessed by four or by chairlift.
