= Lapporten =

Valley in northern Sweden

- Tjuonavagge; Čuonjávággi
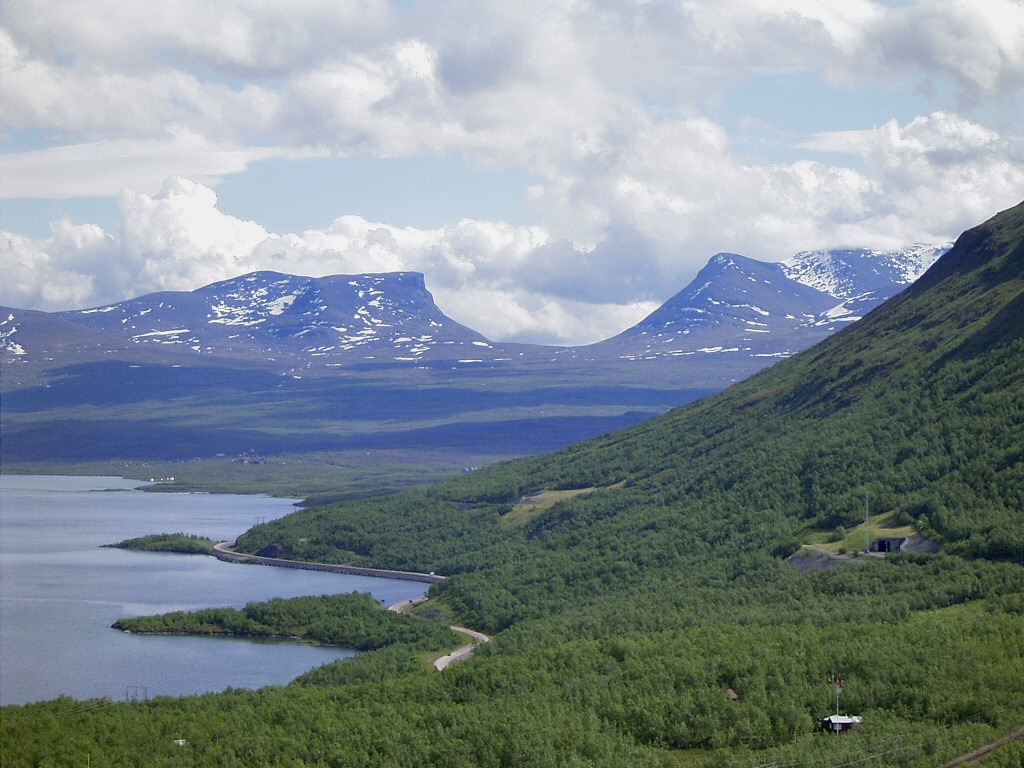

Geography
- Country: Sweden
- State/Province: Norrbotten
- Population center: Kiruna
- Coordinates: 68°16′06″N 18°58′37″E
- Interactive map of Lapporten

Lapporten (Swedish: "The Lapponian Gate") or Tjuonavagge (Northern Sami: Čuonjávággi, "Goose Valley") is a U-shaped valley located just outside Abisko National Park in Lapland in northern Sweden, one of the most familiar natural sights of the mountains there. The valley is bounded to the southwest by the mountain Nissuntjårro (1,738 m) and in the northeast by Tjuonatjåkka (1,554 m). In the middle of the valley lies Lake Čuonjájávri, 950 metres above sea level. The terrain is easy to walk, but has no marked trail. Lapporten is in the Nissuntjårro Natura 2000 site. A world record in highline was set by 4 Germans crossing the 2.1-kilometre (1.3 mi) distance between the mountains on a slackline more than 500 metres (1,600 ft) above ground.
