= Vadvetjåkka National Park =

National park in Sweden

- Vadvetjåkka nationalpark
- IUCN category II (national park)
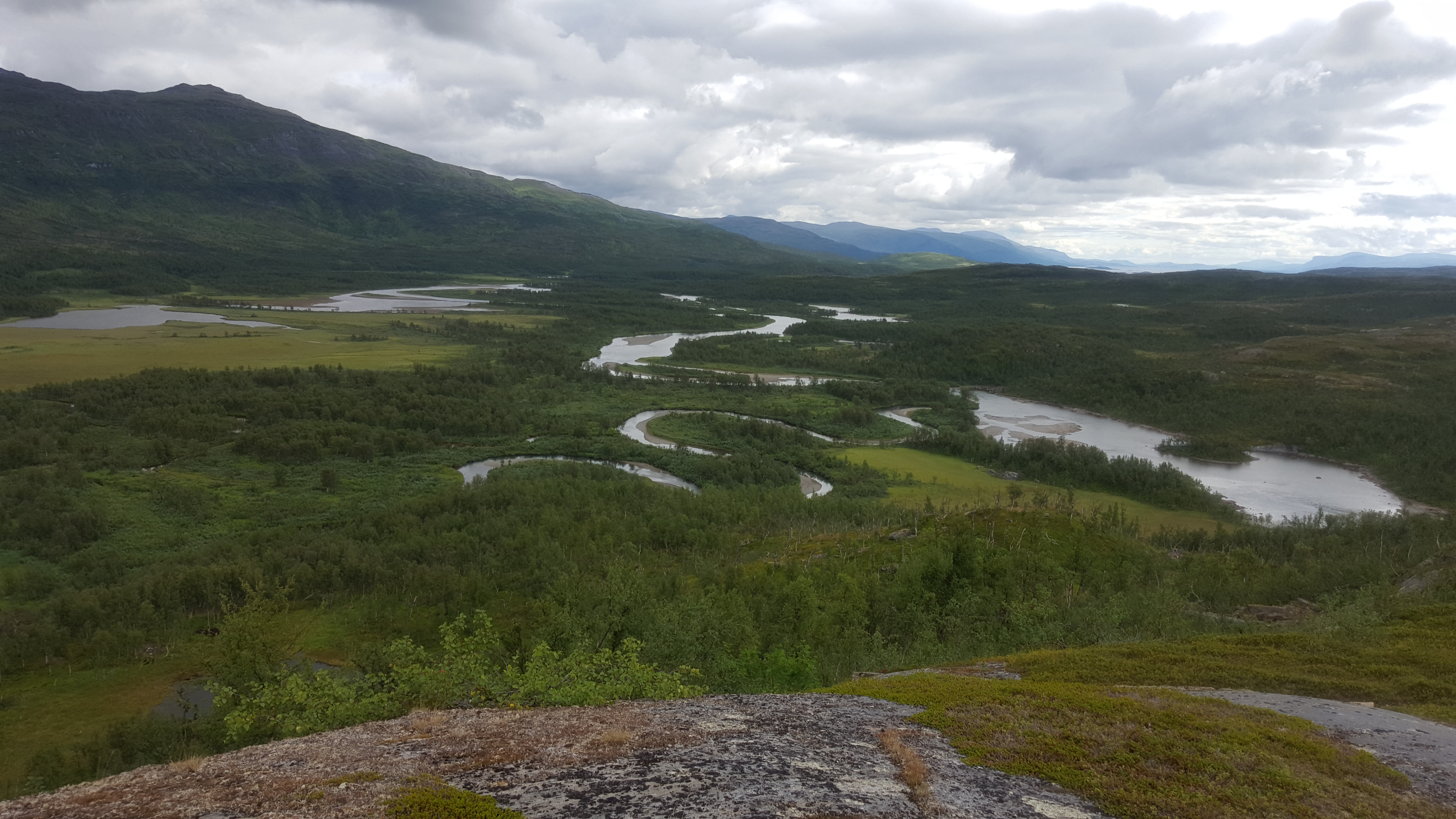
- Interactive map of Vadvetjåkka National Park
- Location: Norrbotten County, Sweden
- Coordinates: 68°33′N 18°24′E
- Area: 26.3 km^{2} (10.2 sq mi)
- Established: 1920
- Governing body: Naturvårdsverket

Vadvetjåkka is a national park in Kiruna, Norrbotten County, Sweden.

National parks of Sweden (clickable map)
