= Torneträsk =

Lake in Kiruna municipality in Sweden

- Torneträsk (Swedish); Duortnosjávri (Northern Sami); Torniojärvi (Meänkieli)
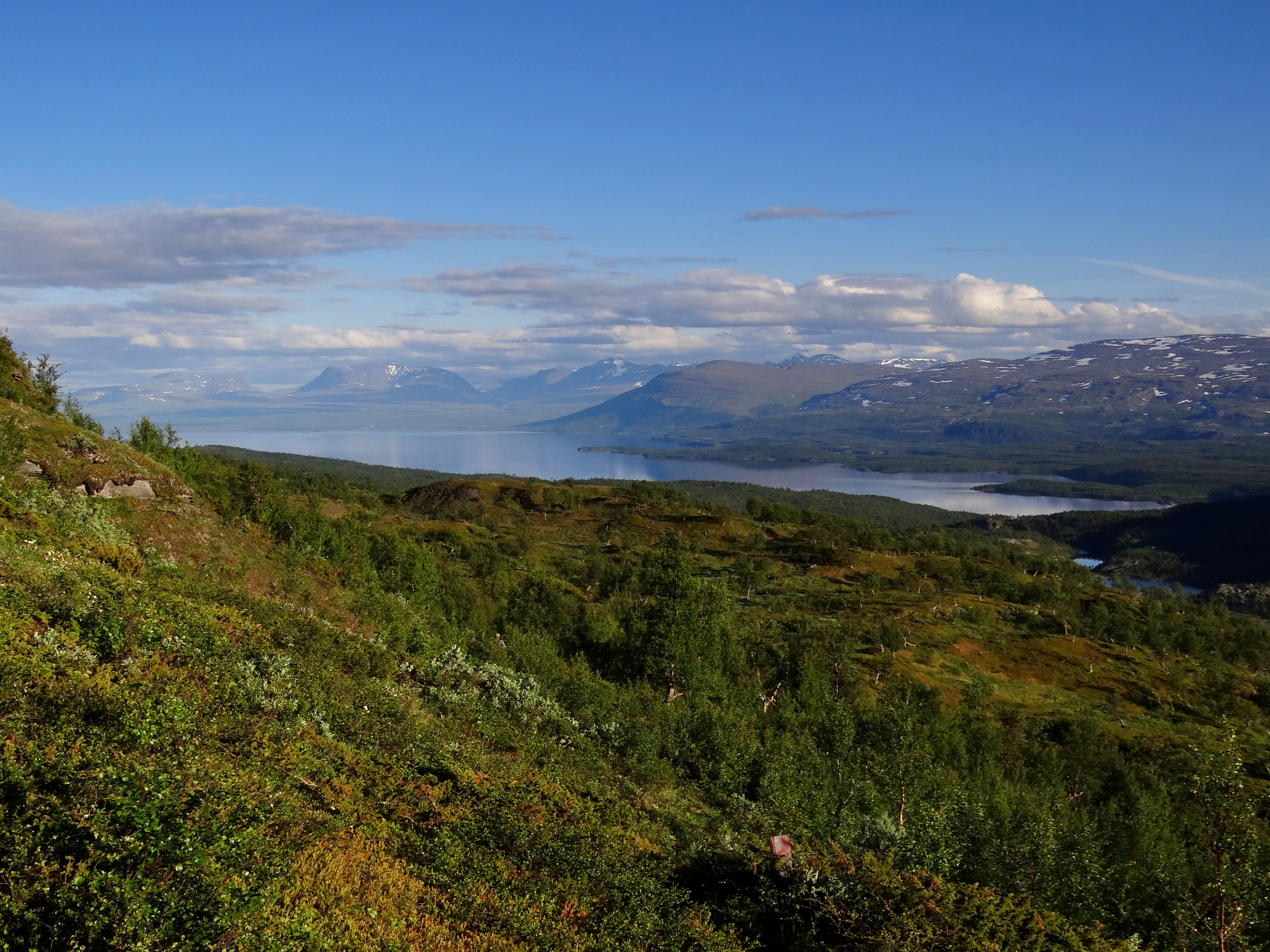
- Torneträsk seen from the north

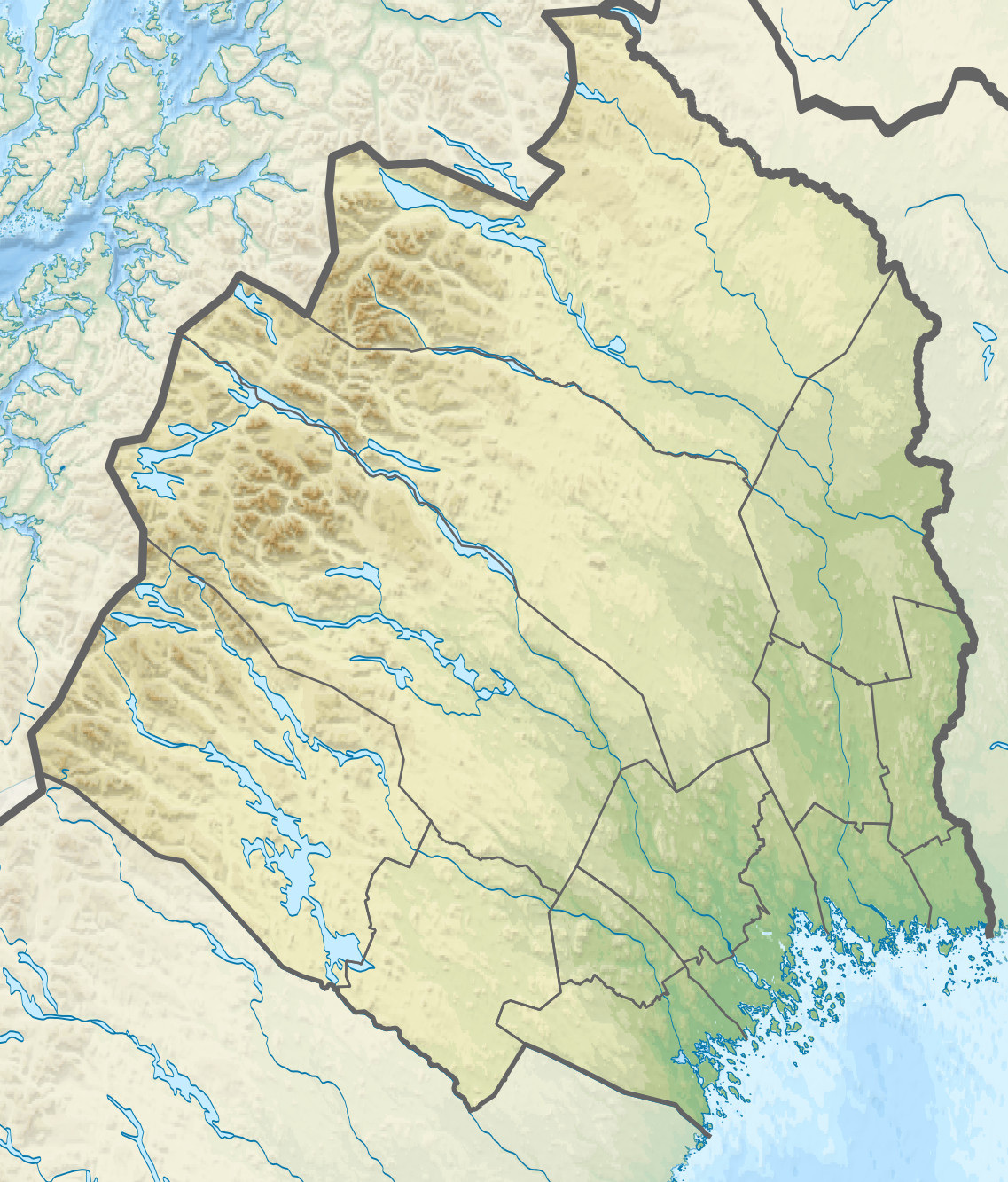
- Location within Sweden Location within Norrbotten
- Location: Kiruna Municipality, Norrbotten County
- Coordinates: 68°22′N 019°06′E
- Primary inflows: • nameless flow from a little glacier south of lake Válfojávri (Nordland, Norway) → river Válfojohka → lake Gamajávri → river Kamajåkka → lake Abiskojaure → river Abiskojåkka • river Njuoreatnu • river Rágeseatnu • lake Koojärvi → river Stalojåkka • river Nakerijoki • river Sarvájohka • river Bessešjohka
- Primary outflows: Torne River
- Basin countries: Sweden
- Max. length: 70 km (43 mi)
- Max. width: 11 km (6.8 mi)
- Surface area: 332 km^{2} (128 sq mi)
- Average depth: 51 m (167 ft)
- Max. depth: 168 m (551 ft)
- Water volume: 17.1 km^{3} (13.9×10^{6} acre⋅ft)
- Surface elevation: 341 m (1,119 ft)

Torneträsk or Torne träsk (Swedish: [toːɳɛˈtrɛsːk]; Saami: Duortnosjávri; Finnish and Meänkieli: Tornio or Torniojärvi) is a lake in Kiruna Municipality, Lapland, Norrbotten County in Sweden, in the Scandinavian Mountains. Träsk is the local word for lake (in Standard Swedish it means "swamp"). It is the sixth-largest lake in Sweden, with a total area of 330 square kilometres (130 square miles) and a length of 70 kilometres (43 miles). The lake drains to the south-east through Torne river. South-west of the lake lies the Abisko National Park and the UNESCO World Heritage Site Laponian area.

Torneträsk originated from the remnant of a glacier, which has given the lake its depth of 168 metres (551 feet), making it the second-deepest lake in Sweden. It is usually ice-covered from December through June, with variations dependent on temperature variations.

Permafrost is common in the land around the lake. This low elevation permafrost is disappearing because of global warming and increased snowfall.

During the 1944 Operation Obviate of WWII, British bombers seeking to destroy the German battleship Tirpitz had their rendezvous over Torneträsk, in violation of Swedish neutrality.

== Climate ==
Climate data for Torneträsk 1991-2020 normals (393m)
Month	Jan	Feb	Mar	Apr	May	Jun	Jul	Aug	Sep	Oct	Nov	Dec	Year
Mean daily maximum °C (°F)	−6.4 (20.5)	−6.6 (20.1)	−3.0 (26.6)	2.0 (35.6)	7.5 (45.5)	13.6 (56.5)	17.3 (63.1)	15.2 (59.4)	9.8 (49.6)	2.8 (37.0)	−2.4 (27.7)	−4.5 (23.9)	3.8 (38.8)
Daily mean °C (°F)	−10.1 (13.8)	−10.4 (13.3)	−6.8 (19.8)	−1.7 (28.9)	3.9 (39.0)	9.7 (49.5)	12.9 (55.2)	11.2 (52.2)	6.6 (43.9)	0.2 (32.4)	−5.2 (22.6)	−8.0 (17.6)	0.2 (32.4)
Mean daily minimum °C (°F)	−14.7 (5.5)	−14.9 (5.2)	−11.2 (11.8)	−5.6 (21.9)	0.4 (32.7)	5.6 (42.1)	9.0 (48.2)	7.4 (45.3)	3.4 (38.1)	−2.4 (27.7)	−8.8 (16.2)	−12.2 (10.0)	−3.7 (25.4)
Average precipitation mm (inches)	29.5 (1.16)	23.7 (0.93)	20.9 (0.82)	20.4 (0.80)	36.7 (1.44)	58.4 (2.30)	93.1 (3.67)	65.5 (2.58)	48.9 (1.93)	37.6 (1.48)	29.9 (1.18)	31.5 (1.24)	496.1 (19.53)
Source: NOAA

Climate data for Rensjön A 1991-2020 normals (494m)
Month	Jan	Feb	Mar	Apr	May	Jun	Jul	Aug	Sep	Oct	Nov	Dec	Year
Mean daily maximum °C (°F)	−7.3 (18.9)	−7.3 (18.9)	−3.5 (25.7)	1.4 (34.5)	7.2 (45.0)	13.7 (56.7)	17.3 (63.1)	15.0 (59.0)	9.6 (49.3)	2.0 (35.6)	−3.6 (25.5)	−5.5 (22.1)	3.3 (37.9)
Daily mean °C (°F)	−12.2 (10.0)	−12.2 (10.0)	−8.4 (16.9)	−3.0 (26.6)	3.0 (37.4)	9.0 (48.2)	12.3 (54.1)	10.3 (50.5)	5.4 (41.7)	−1.5 (29.3)	−7.7 (18.1)	−10.1 (13.8)	−1.3 (29.7)
Mean daily minimum °C (°F)	−18.0 (−0.4)	−18.1 (−0.6)	−14.3 (6.3)	−8.3 (17.1)	−1.3 (29.7)	4.6 (40.3)	7.8 (46.0)	5.9 (42.6)	1.4 (34.5)	−5.2 (22.6)	−12.7 (9.1)	−15.6 (3.9)	−6.2 (20.8)
Average precipitation mm (inches)	25.8 (1.02)	20.7 (0.81)	18.8 (0.74)	21.8 (0.86)	41.3 (1.63)	57.1 (2.25)	90.8 (3.57)	64.3 (2.53)	48.7 (1.92)	39.8 (1.57)	29.9 (1.18)	29.6 (1.17)	488.6 (19.25)
Source: NOAA

== Images ==
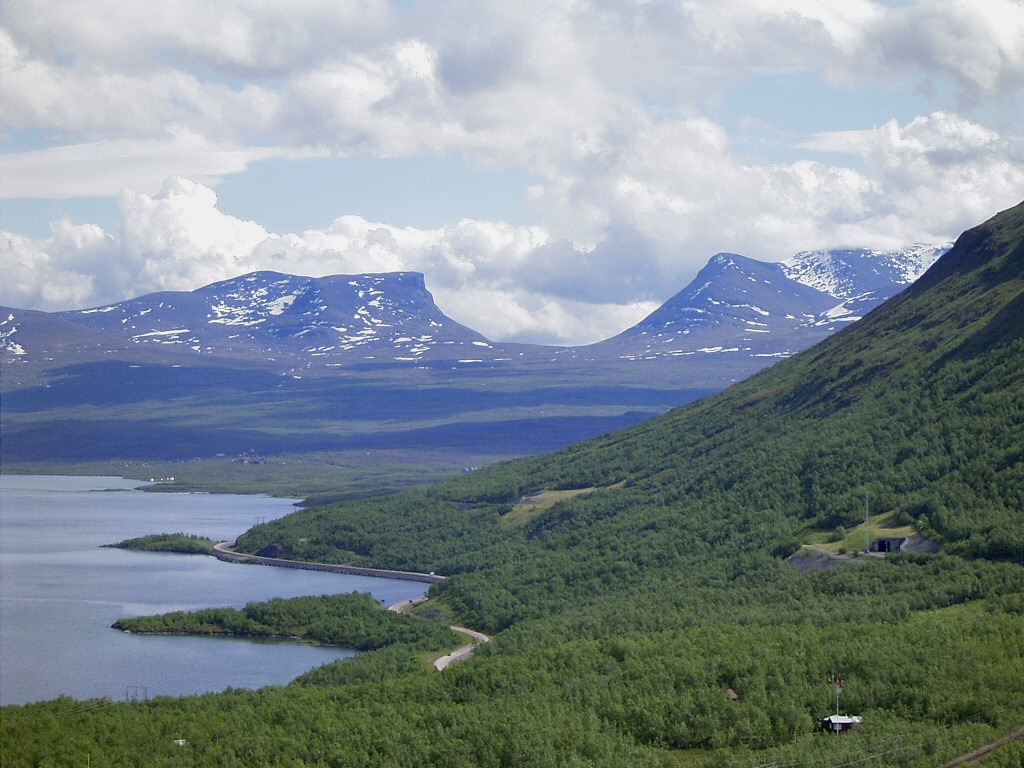
The lake and Lapporten in the background

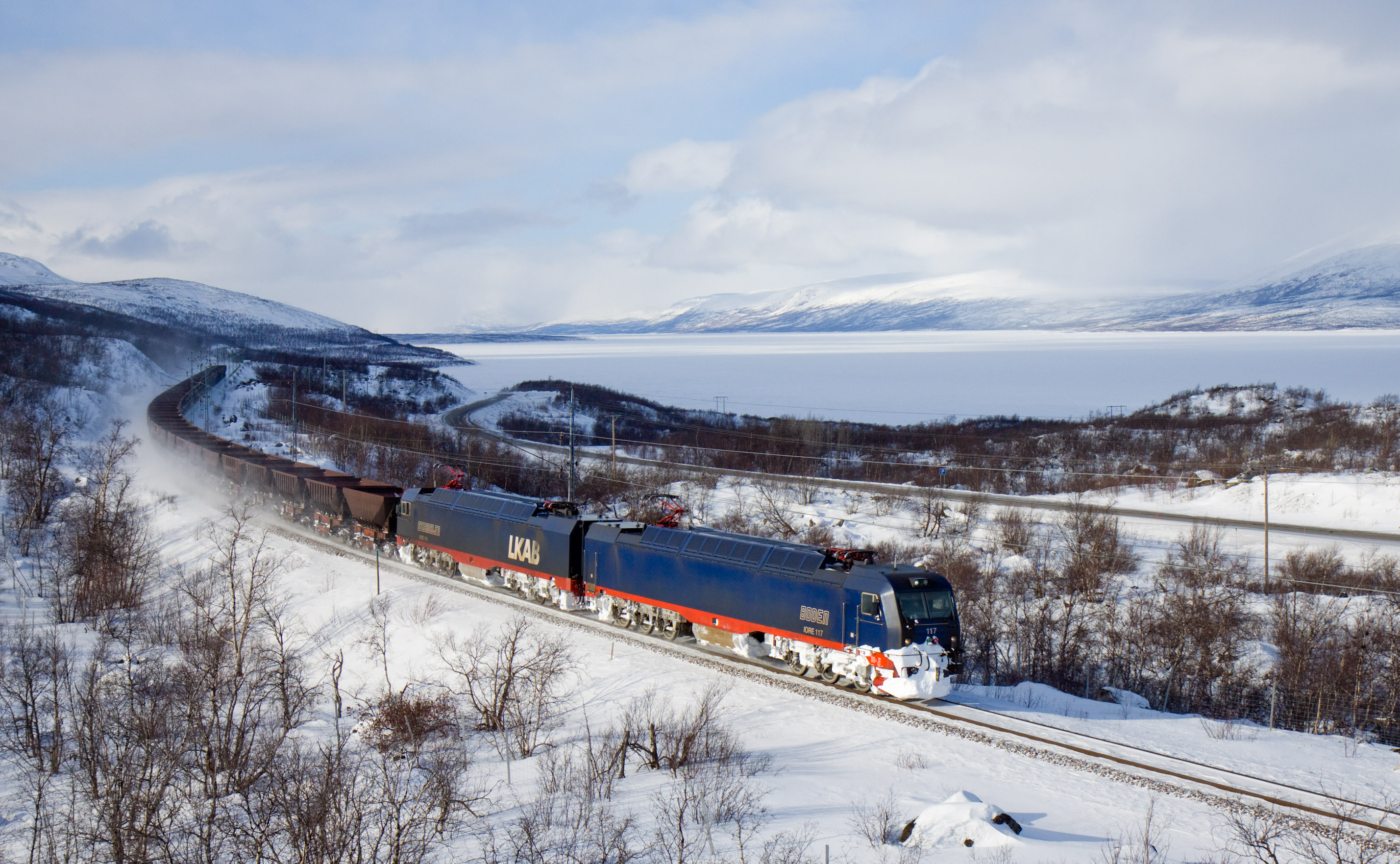
IORE train and Torneträsk lake

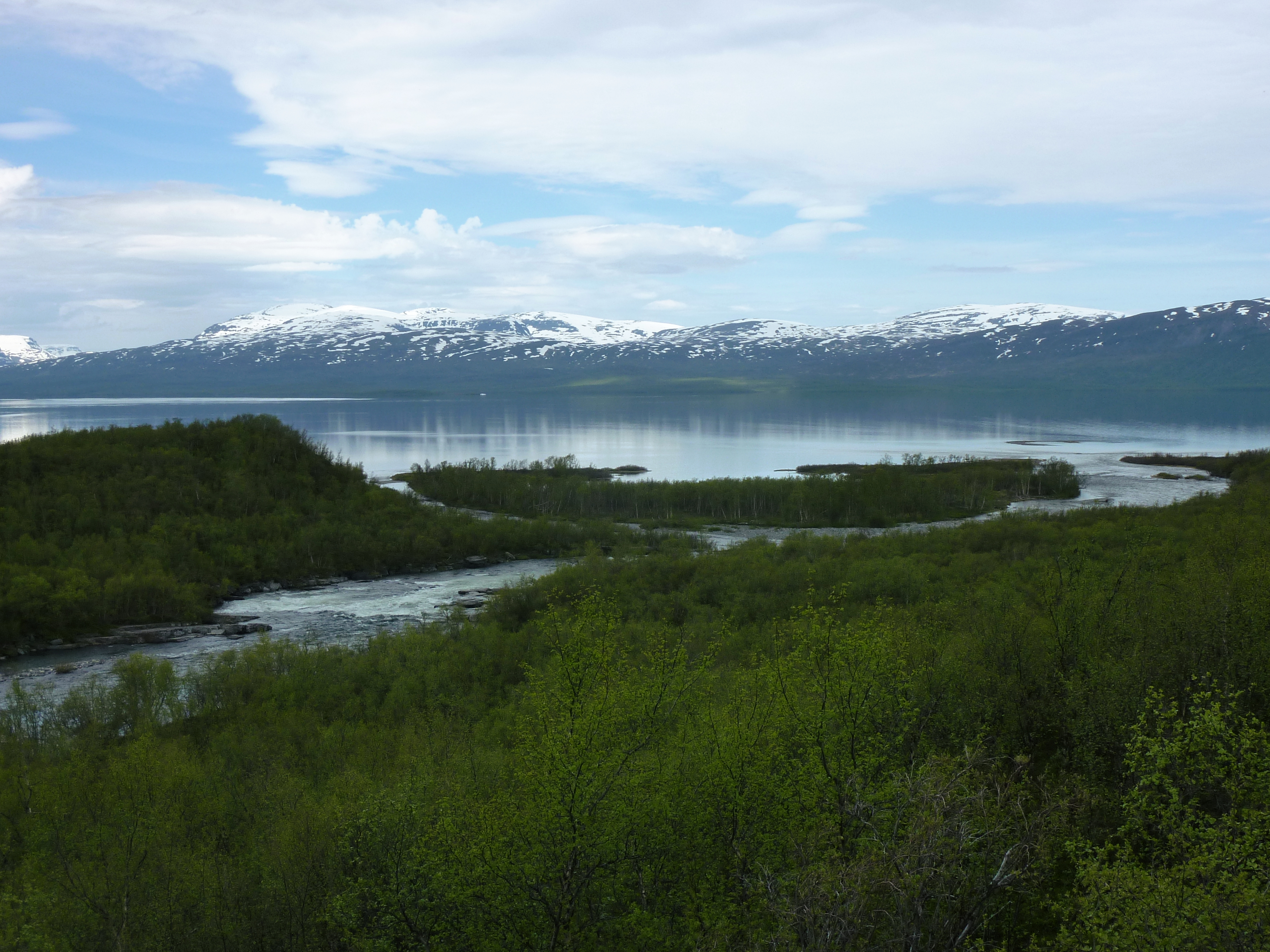
Abiskojåkka river and Torneträsk lake at Abisko

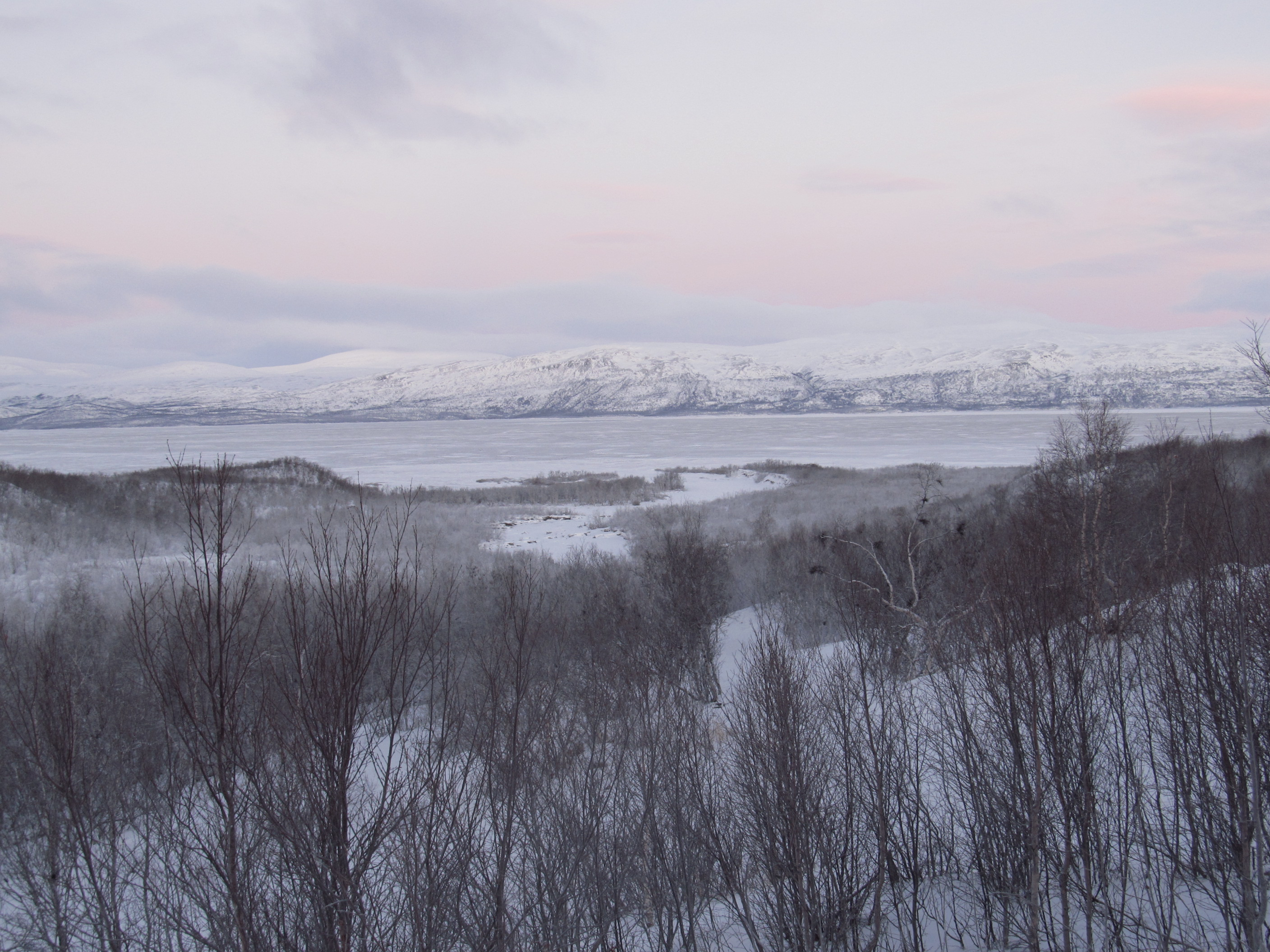
View of Torneträsk lake, frozen, from STF Abisko Turiststation (Jan 2013)

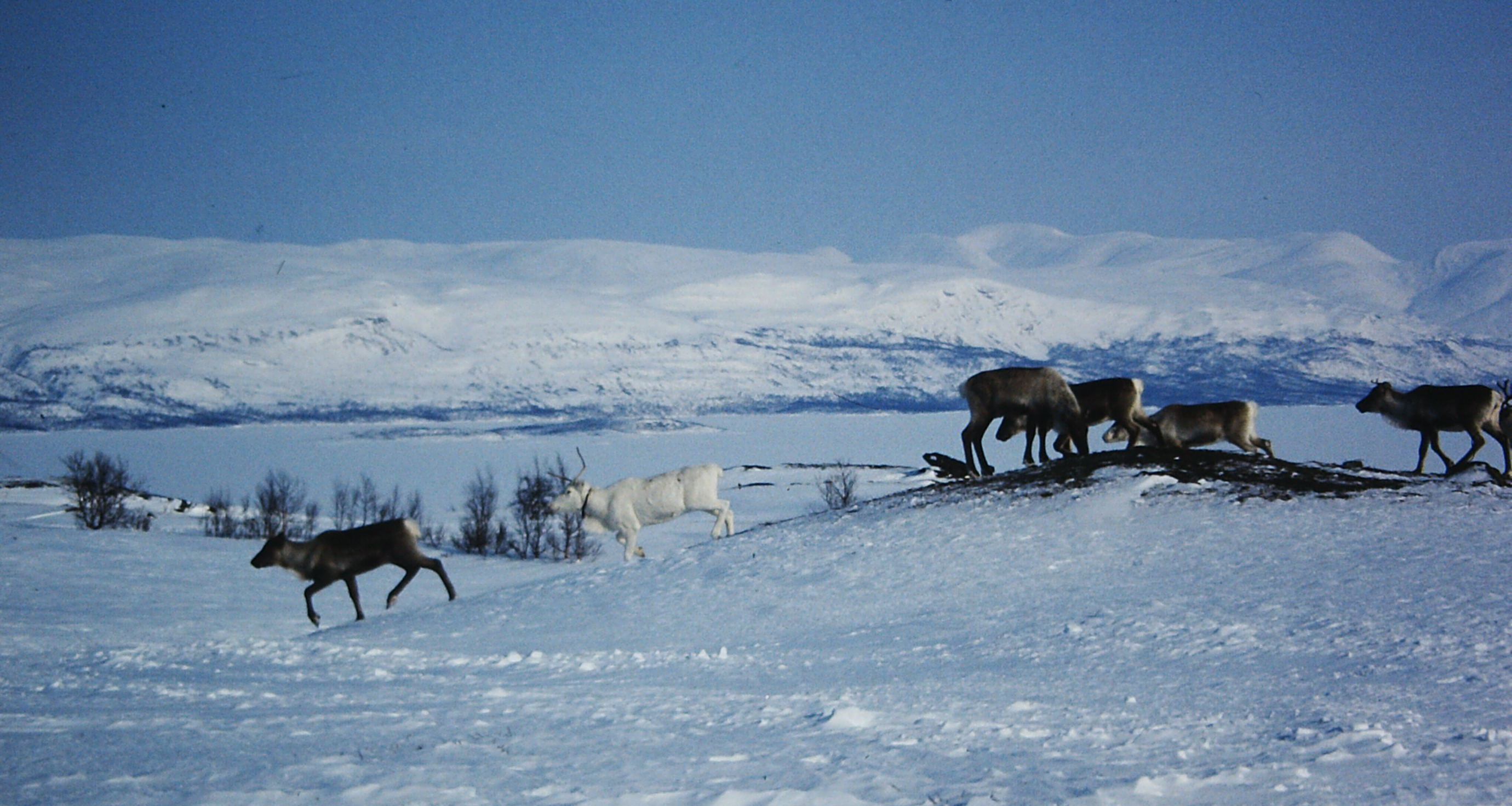
Reindeers at Torneträsk lake, Abisko area, in March 1992

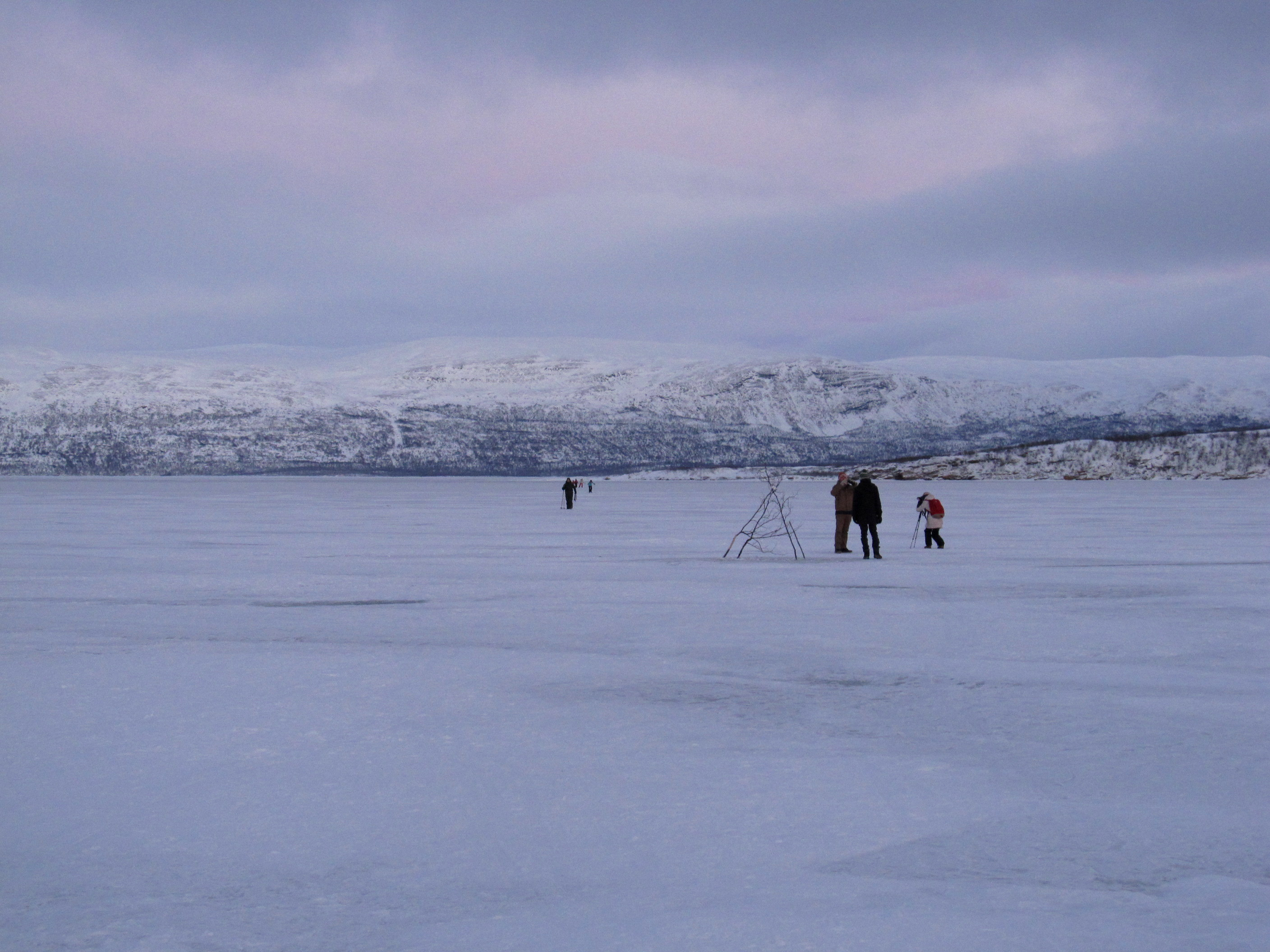
Frozen Torneträsk lake, with people walking and taking pictures on its surface (Jan 2013)

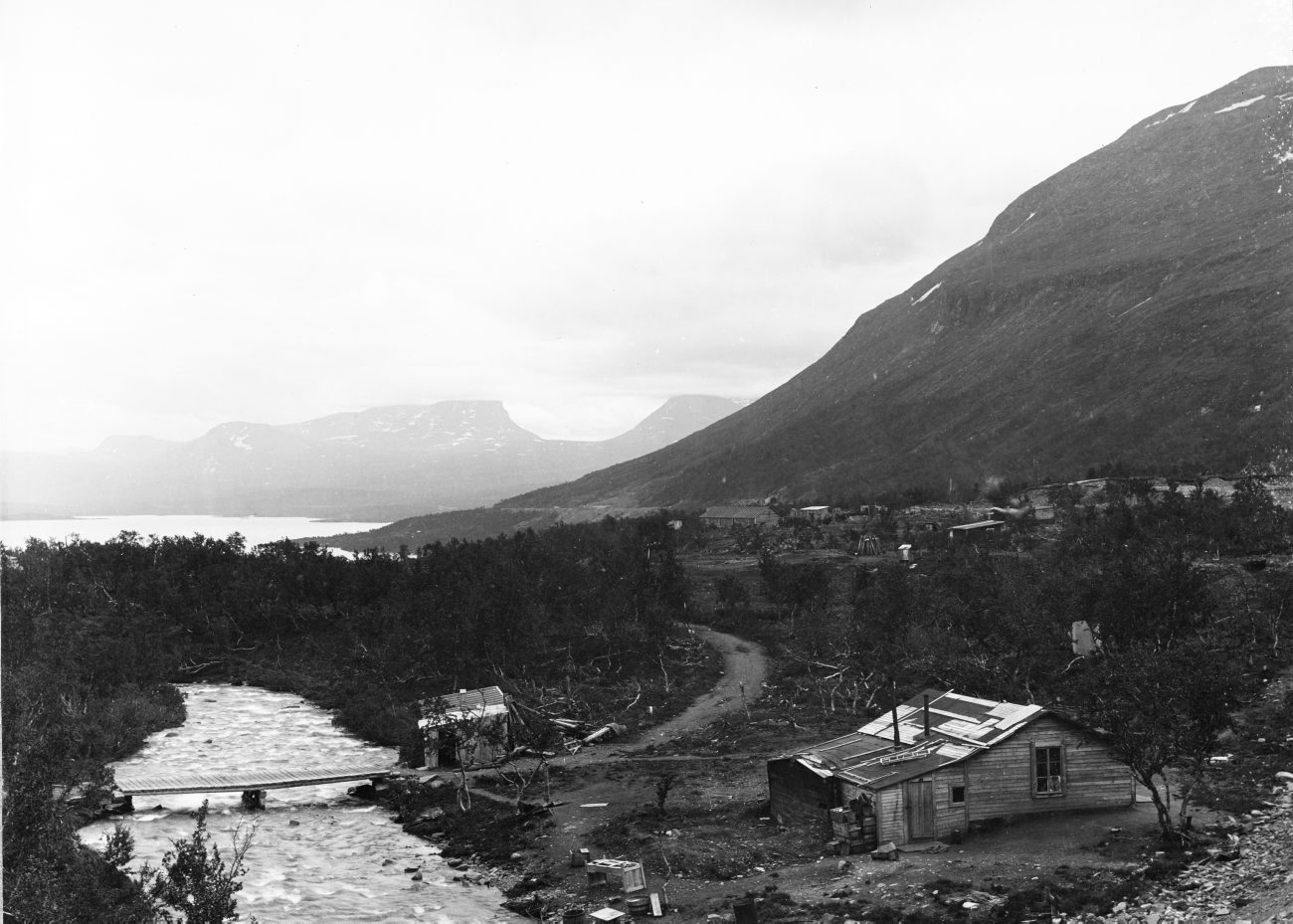
View of Torneträsk, Lapland, around 1900.
