= Abisko =

Village in northern Sweden

Abisko (Swedish) Ábeskovvu (Northern Sami)
- Village
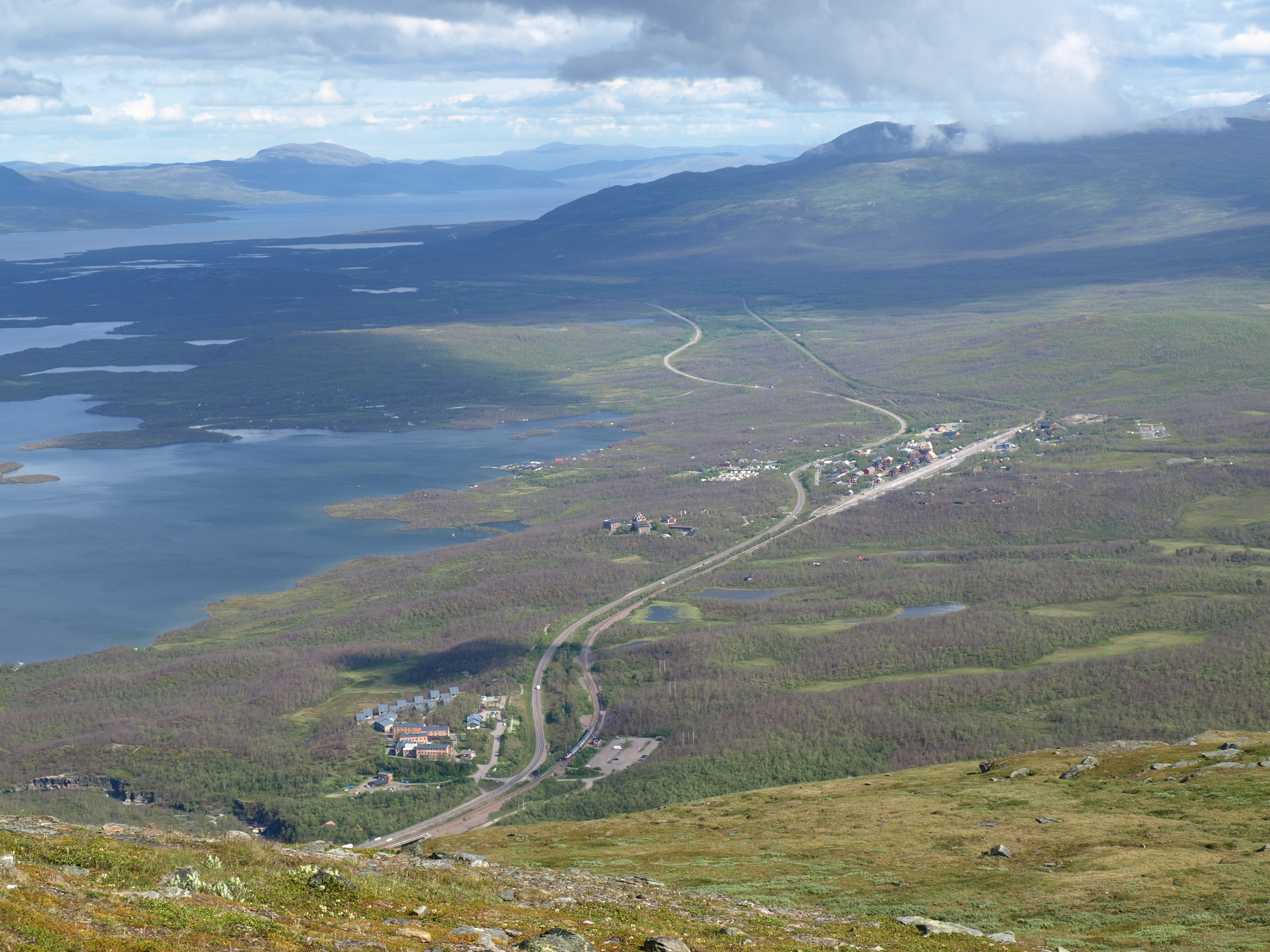
- Picture of Abisko, taken from the mountain Nuolja. In the foreground, Abisko Turiststation and the bottom part of the Abisko canyon can be seen. Further away is the village Abisko Östra. To the left in the picture, the lake Torneträsk can be seen.

- Location within Norrbotten Location within Sweden
- Coordinates: 68°21′N 18°49′E
- Country: Sweden
- Municipality: Kiruna Municipality
- County: Norrbotten County
- Province: Lappland

Area
  - Total: 0.13 km^{2} (0.050 sq mi)

Population (2005-12-31)
  - Total: 85
  - Density: 658/km^{2} (1,700/sq mi)
- Time zone: UTC+1 (CET)
  - Summer (DST): UTC+2 (CEST)

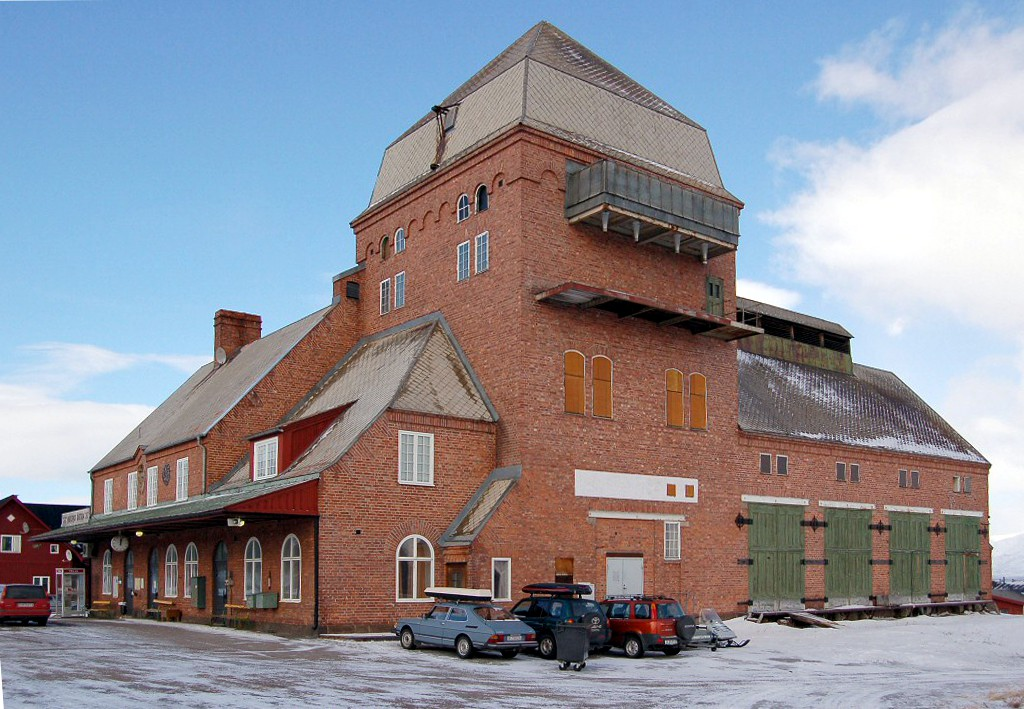
Abisko east railway station

Abisko (Swedish: [ˈɑ̌ːbɪskʊ]; Northern Sami: Ábeskovvu) is a village in Sápmi (Lapland), in northern Sweden, roughly 200 km north of the Arctic Circle, and near Abisko National Park, located 4 km west of the village. It had 85 inhabitants as of 2005.

Permafrost is common around the village, although this low-altitude permafrost is disappearing because of global warming and increased snowfall.

== Transportation ==
Daily passenger electric trains run by SJ AB connect Stockholm with the Norwegian city of Narvik, stopping at both the Abisko village (the name of that railway station is Abisko Östra [east]) and the Abisko Turiststation. Additional regional trains provide links along the Kiruna-Narvik stretch. Abisko is also reachable by car via the highway E10 which has linked Kiruna and Narvik since the early 1980s. Other local forms of transportation include hiking and dog-sledding in winter. A chair-lift provides access to a point below the summit of nearby Mt. Nuolja.

== Tourism ==
The 425 kilometer-long Kungsleden hiking trail, which follows the Scandinavian mountain range, starts (or ends) at the Abisko Turiststation (consisting of a railway station of the same name and the Abisko Youth Hostel) (approx. 4 km west of the village itself) and follows through the national park. The Nordkalottruta uses trails of the park as part of its longer passage. The Abisko Turiststation, run by the Svenska Turistföreningen (STF), houses many visitors to the park and provides lodging, food, and other amenities, and is one of many similar facilities located periodically along the Kungsleden trail. The national park is known for its cross-country skiing opportunities, snowshoeing, and other winter sports (Mount Nuolja and nearby Björkliden provides backcountry skiing and freeriding opportunities). The nine-hole golfcourse at Björkliden is the northern most in Sweden. As its location is 195 km north of the Arctic Circle, summer hikers enjoy the midnight sun, while winter visitors may find the light pollution-free location ideal for viewing the aurora borealis. One of the most recognized natural sights is Lapporten, a U-shaped valley visible from Abisko. Abisko is also located near the 330 square kilometre (130 sq mi) lake Torneträsk.

== Research station ==
Abisko is home to the Abisko Scientific Research Station, an important centre for research into Arctic ecology and climate change. The research station hosts the Climate Impacts Research Centre, Umeå University, where research, education and outreach on aquatic and terrestrial ecology are undertaken.

== Climate ==
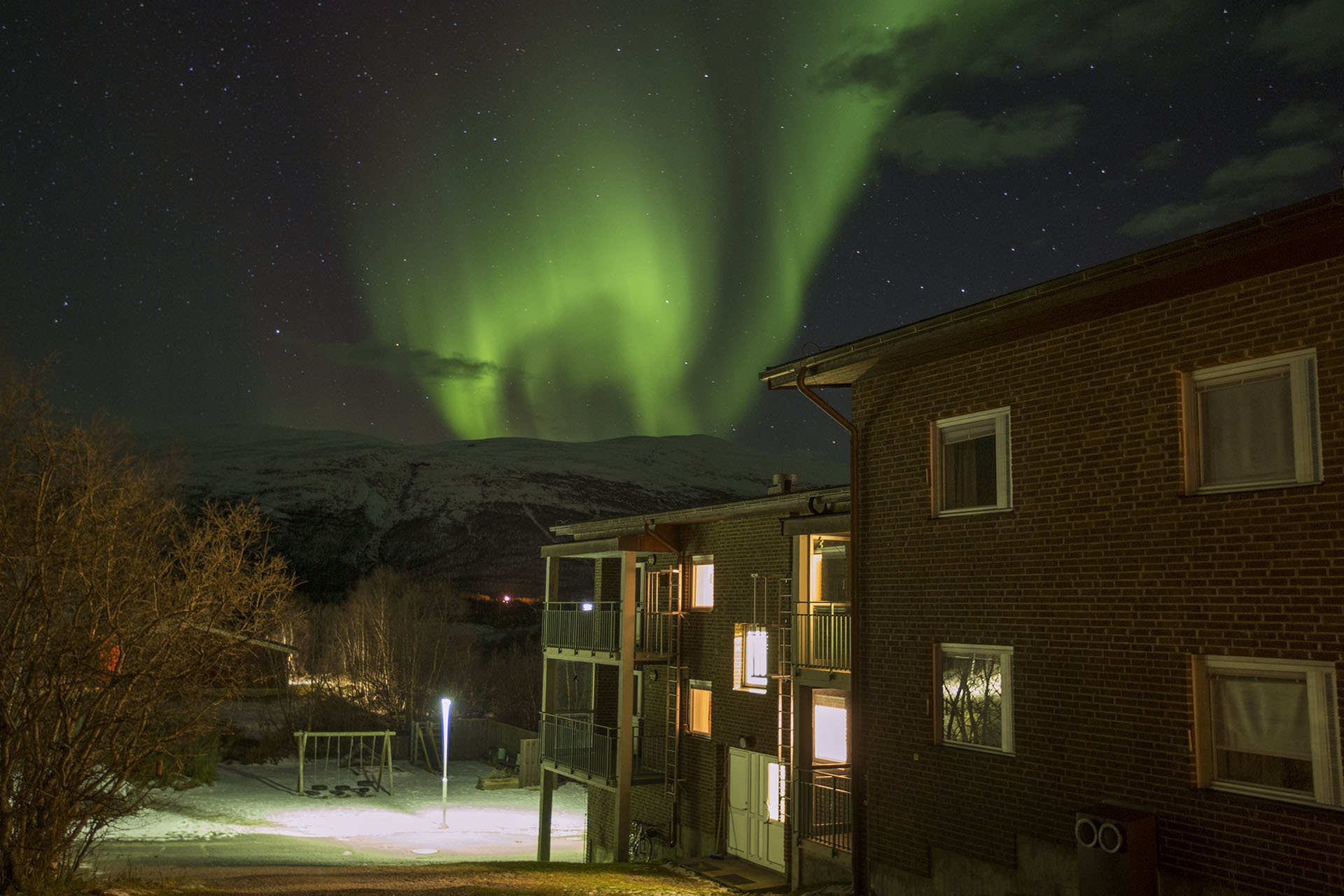
Northern Lights in Abisko.

Abisko has a subarctic climate (Dfc), typical of Northern Sweden in Lapland. Summers are cool and rainy with chilly nights and snow covers are often modest except for during milder winters where maritime air brings more precipitation. Winters are long and cold but somewhat moderated by mild Gulf Stream air coming from the west. That means Abisko has a milder annual mean temperature than municipal seat Kiruna in spite of the chilly summers. Precipitation peaks during summer. Abisko is a very cloudy village by Swedish standards but is also one of the driest places in the country due to it being in a rain shadow from the Scandinavian Mountains. The difference between it and relatively nearby Riksgränsen is extreme, with Abisko receiving far less than half of the latter's precipitation.

Climate data for Abisko (2002–2020 averages; extremes since 1913)
Month	Jan	Feb	Mar	Apr	May	Jun	Jul	Aug	Sep	Oct	Nov	Dec	Year
Record high °C (°F)	8.3 (46.9)	8.8 (47.8)	8.9 (48.0)	13.3 (55.9)	25.9 (78.6)	26.5 (79.7)	32.8 (91.0)	28.7 (83.7)	20.0 (68.0)	15.3 (59.5)	10.6 (51.1)	7.7 (45.9)	32.8 (91.0)
Mean maximum °C (°F)	4.0 (39.2)	4.7 (40.5)	5.3 (41.5)	9.6 (49.3)	17.8 (64.0)	22.0 (71.6)	24.7 (76.5)	23.2 (73.8)	16.8 (62.2)	10.3 (50.5)	6.5 (43.7)	5.1 (41.2)	25.8 (78.4)
Mean daily maximum °C (°F)	−6.4 (20.5)	−5.9 (21.4)	−2.4 (27.7)	3.1 (37.6)	8.6 (47.5)	13.5 (56.3)	17.4 (63.3)	15.4 (59.7)	10.2 (50.4)	3.5 (38.3)	−0.7 (30.7)	−3.0 (26.6)	4.4 (40.0)
Daily mean °C (°F)	−10.5 (13.1)	−10.0 (14.0)	−6.4 (20.5)	−0.8 (30.6)	4.6 (40.3)	9.3 (48.7)	12.9 (55.2)	11.3 (52.3)	6.8 (44.2)	0.6 (33.1)	−4.0 (24.8)	−6.7 (19.9)	0.6 (33.1)
Mean daily minimum °C (°F)	−14.6 (5.7)	−14.1 (6.6)	−10.4 (13.3)	−4.6 (23.7)	0.6 (33.1)	5.0 (41.0)	8.4 (47.1)	7.1 (44.8)	3.3 (37.9)	−2.4 (27.7)	−7.2 (19.0)	−10.3 (13.5)	−3.3 (26.1)
Mean minimum °C (°F)	−26.4 (−15.5)	−26.8 (−16.2)	−22.7 (−8.9)	−14.2 (6.4)	−5.0 (23.0)	−0.1 (31.8)	2.9 (37.2)	0.9 (33.6)	−2.6 (27.3)	−11.2 (11.8)	−16.1 (3.0)	−21.4 (−6.5)	−29.8 (−21.6)
Record low °C (°F)	−34.7 (−30.5)	−33.9 (−29.0)	−33.1 (−27.6)	−18.5 (−1.3)	−8.0 (17.6)	−1.8 (28.8)	0.7 (33.3)	−1.5 (29.3)	−6.0 (21.2)	−17.6 (0.3)	−23.1 (−9.6)	−30.2 (−22.4)	−34.7 (−30.5)
Average precipitation mm (inches)	26.5 (1.04)	21.9 (0.86)	20.5 (0.81)	11.5 (0.45)	18.9 (0.74)	33.8 (1.33)	65.0 (2.56)	43.8 (1.72)	40.9 (1.61)	21.2 (0.83)	17.5 (0.69)	27.5 (1.08)	349 (13.72)
Average extreme snow depth cm (inches)	50 (20)	63 (25)	68 (27)	65 (26)	27 (11)	0 (0)	0 (0)	0 (0)	1 (0.4)	8 (3.1)	18 (7.1)	38 (15)	76 (30)
Mean monthly sunshine hours	0	39	126	178	231	238	235	175	99	69	2	0	1,392
Source 1: SMHI Open Data
Source 2: SMHI climate data 2002–2020

Climate data for Abisko 1991–2018 (Sunshine 2002–2018)
Month	Jan	Feb	Mar	Apr	May	Jun	Jul	Aug	Sep	Oct	Nov	Dec	Year
Record high °C (°F)	8.3 (46.9)	8.8 (47.8)	9.9 (49.8)	13.3 (55.9)	25.9 (78.6)	26.5 (79.7)	32.8 (91.0)	29.1 (84.4)	21.9 (71.4)	15.3 (59.5)	10.6 (51.1)	8.1 (46.6)	32.8 (91.0)
Mean daily maximum °C (°F)	−5.6 (21.9)	−6.2 (20.8)	−2.6 (27.3)	2.5 (36.5)	8.0 (46.4)	13.4 (56.1)	17.0 (62.6)	14.9 (58.8)	9.9 (49.8)	3.4 (38.1)	−1.1 (30.0)	−3.4 (25.9)	4.2 (39.5)
Daily mean °C (°F)	−9.8 (14.4)	−10.3 (13.5)	−6.6 (20.1)	−1.3 (29.7)	4.1 (39.4)	9.1 (48.4)	12.6 (54.7)	10.9 (51.6)	6.5 (43.7)	0.6 (33.1)	−4.4 (24.1)	−7.0 (19.4)	0.4 (32.7)
Mean daily minimum °C (°F)	−13.4 (7.9)	−14.5 (5.9)	−10.7 (12.7)	−5.2 (22.6)	0.3 (32.5)	4.9 (40.8)	8.2 (46.8)	6.9 (44.4)	3.1 (37.6)	−2.3 (27.9)	−7.6 (18.3)	−10.7 (12.7)	−3.4 (25.8)
Record low °C (°F)	−35.5 (−31.9)	−34.2 (−29.6)	−33.1 (−27.6)	−19.8 (−3.6)	−11.4 (11.5)	−1.8 (28.8)	0.1 (32.2)	−1.5 (29.3)	−7.1 (19.2)	−17.6 (0.3)	−23.2 (−9.8)	−30.2 (−22.4)	−35.5 (−31.9)
Average precipitation mm (inches)	27 (1.1)	21 (0.8)	19 (0.7)	12 (0.5)	19 (0.7)	35 (1.4)	63 (2.5)	44 (1.7)	31 (1.2)	25 (1.0)	21 (0.8)	28 (1.1)	344 (13.5)
Mean monthly sunshine hours	0.0	40.2	128.2	175.8	230.2	228.0	237.1	175.3	97.5	69.2	2.2	0.0	1,383.7
Source 1: SMHI Open Data
Source 2: SMHI Monthly Data
