= Nalovardo =

Ski resort in Västerbotten, Sweden

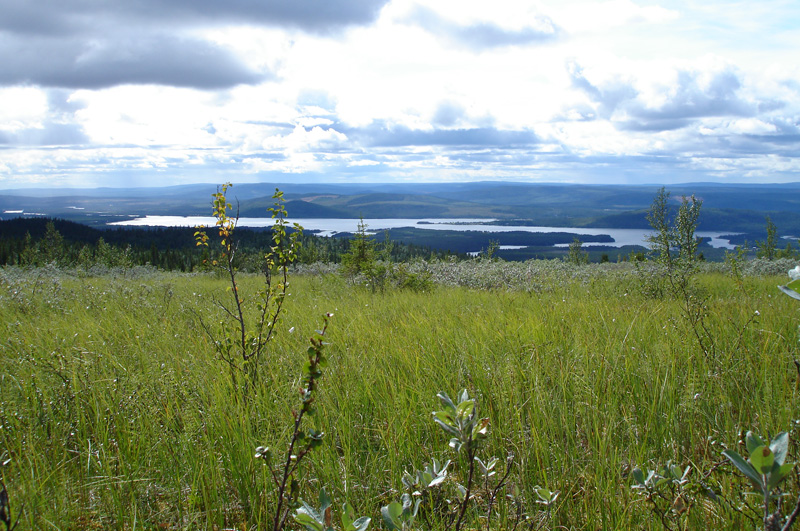
- View from mount Nálluovárdduo/Nalovardo towards the river Vindelälven.
- Interactive map of Nalovardo
- Location: Sorsele Municipality, Västerbotten County, Sweden
- Nearest city: Sorsele
- Coordinates: 65°39′0.36″N 17°30′1.44″E
- Trails: 12
- Lift system: 3 Surface lifts
- Website: http://www.lapplandskatan.nu

Nalovardo is a Swedish ski resort in Sorsele Municipality.
