= Norra Storfjället =

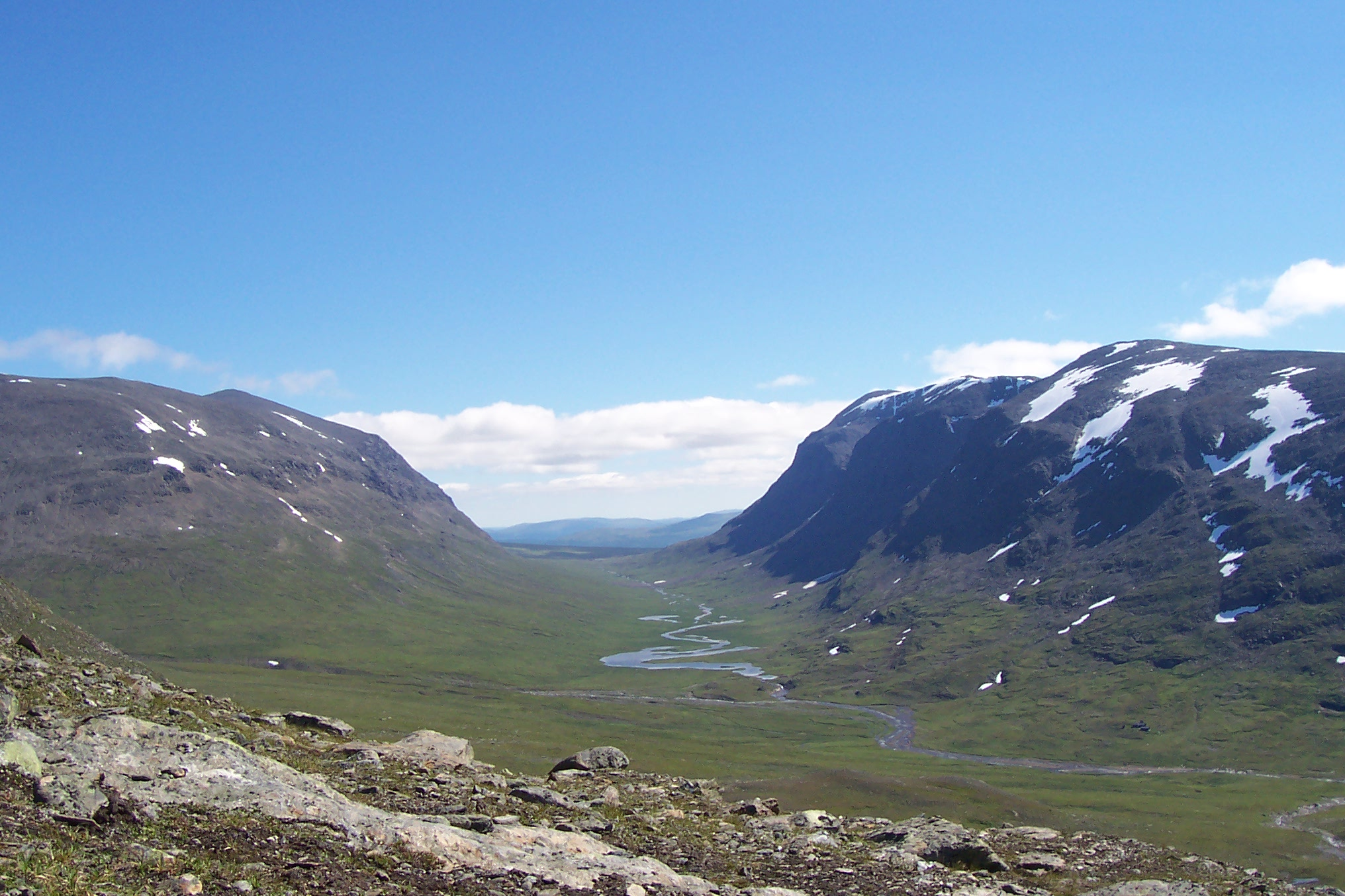
- The U-shaped valley of Syterskalet, which divides the Norra Storfjället into two separate massifs

Highest point
- Elevation: 1,768 m (5,801 ft)
- Coordinates: 65°52′59″N 15°14′00″E

Geography
- Location: Lapland, Sweden
- Parent range: Scandavian Mountains

Map of Vindelfjällen Nature Reserve with Norra Storfjället along the western border.

Norra Storfjället is a minor sub-range of the Scandinavian Mountains, located in the county of Västerbotten, in Lapland, Sweden. It is, for the most part, located within Vindelfjällen Nature Reserve. It reaches a maximum height of 1,768 m (5,801 ft) at the peak known as Norra Sytertoppen. Other peaks include Måskostjakke (1,690 m (5,540 ft)) and Södra Sytertoppen (1,685 m (5,528 ft)). It is divided approximately in half by a deep valley, the valley of Syterskalet – Viterskalet. This U-shaped valley, similar to Lapporten in northern Lapland, is one of the natural landmarks of the reserve. A ski resort is located at Hemavan in the southwest of the area.

== Gallery ==
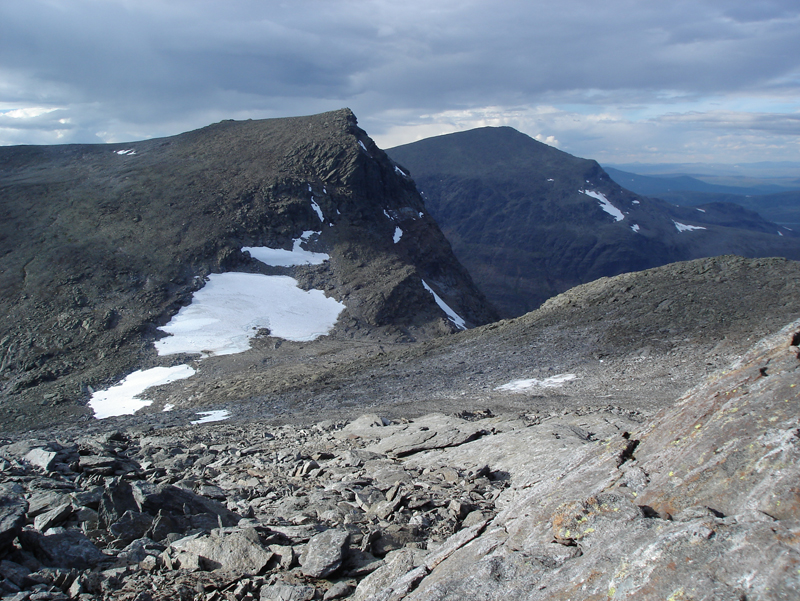
Södra Sytertoppen in the foreground and Norra Sytertoppen in the background.

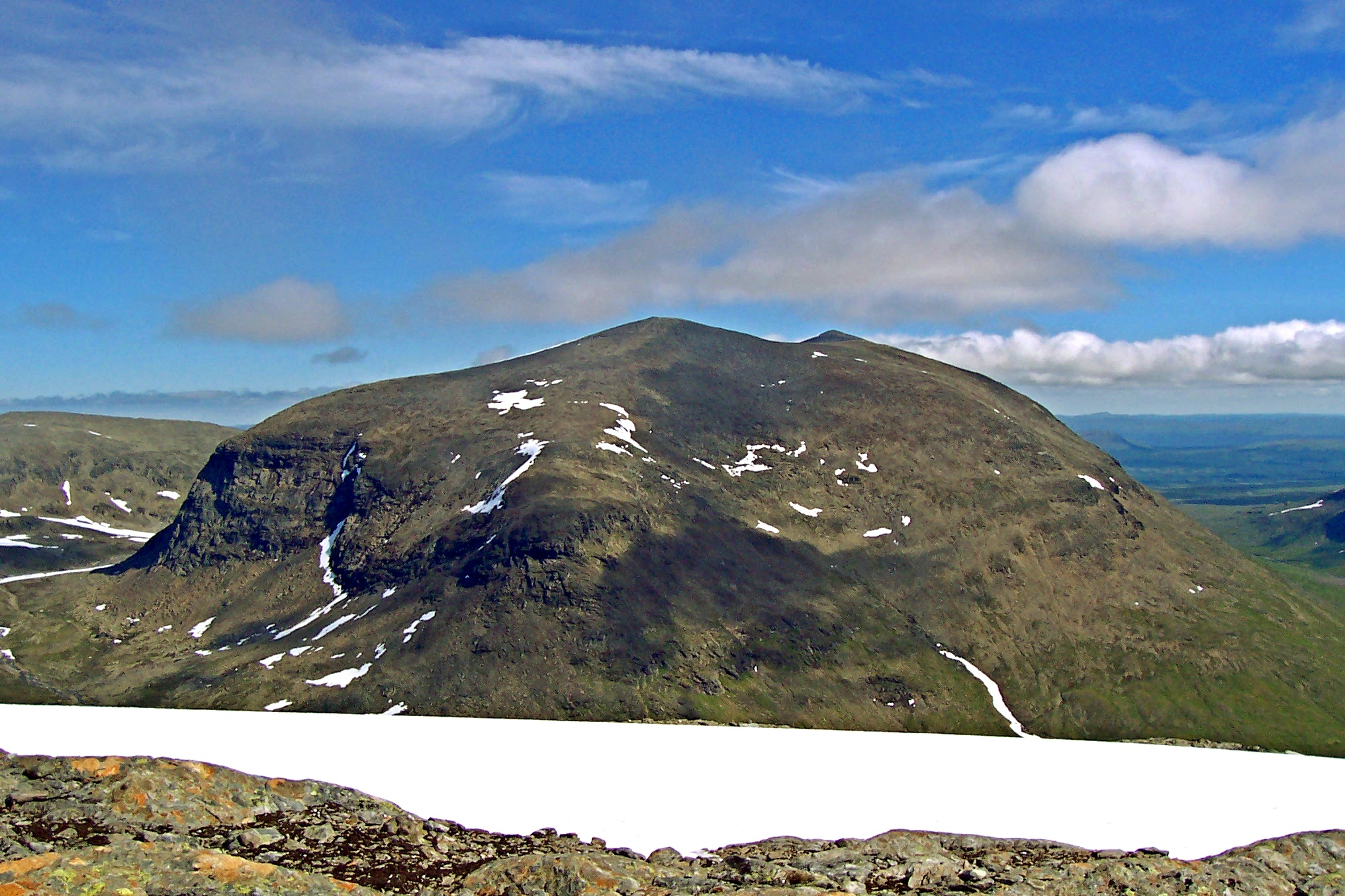
Norra Sytertoppen, the highest point of the Norra Storfjället.

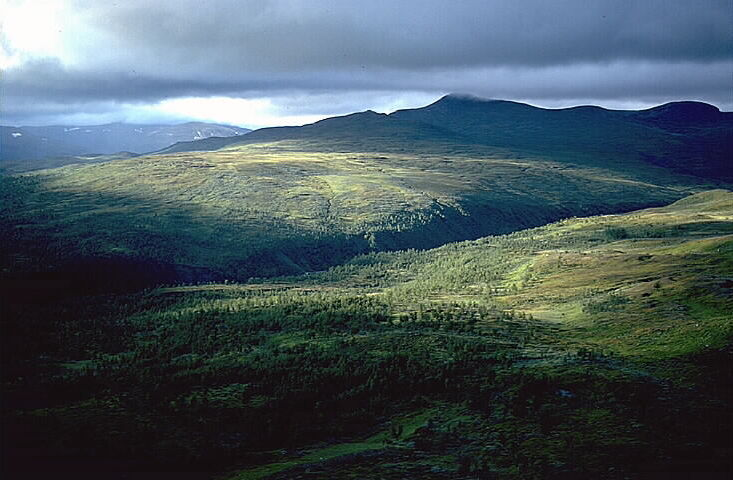
View of Norra Storfjället from a distance
