= Sorsele Municipality =

Sorsele Municipality Sorsele kommun
- Municipality
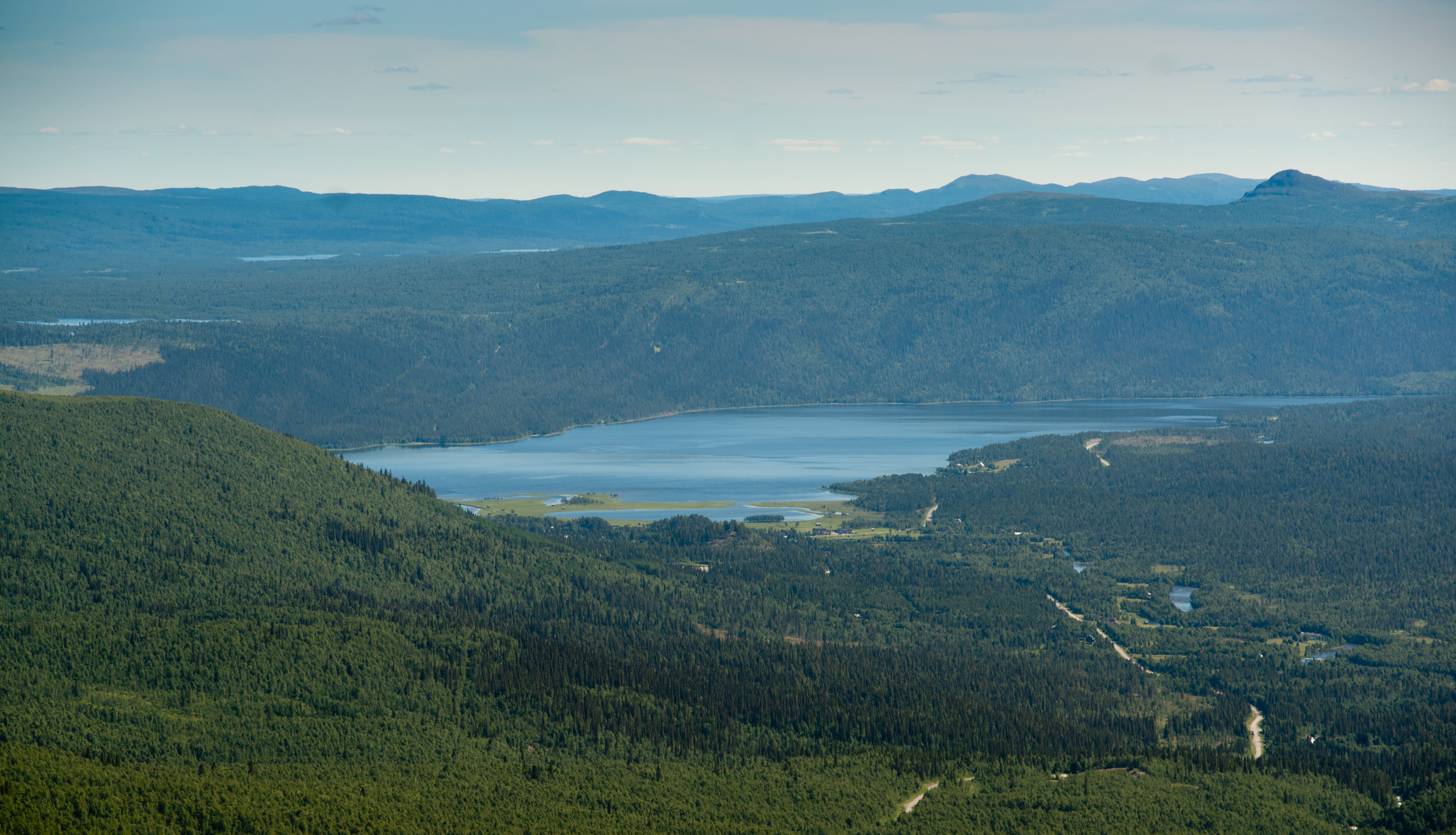

- Coat of arms

- Coordinates: 65°32′N 17°32′E
- Country: Sweden
- County: Västerbotten County
- Seat: Sorsele

Area
  - Total: 7,957.64 km^{2} (3,072.46 sq mi)
  - Land: 7,368.44 km^{2} (2,844.97 sq mi)
  - Water: 589.2 km^{2} (227.5 sq mi)
- Area as of 1 January 2014.

Population (30 June 2025)
  - Total: 2,354
  - Density: 0.3195/km^{2} (0.8274/sq mi)
- Time zone: UTC+1 (CET)
  - Summer (DST): UTC+2 (CEST)
- ISO 3166 code: SE
- Province: Lapland
- Municipal code: 2422
- Website: www.sorsele.se

Sorsele Municipality (Swedish: Sorsele kommun, Ume Sami: Suorsán kommuvdna; Southern Sami: Suarsan tjïelte) is a municipality in Västerbotten County in northern Sweden. Its seat is located in Sorsele.

Sorsele Municipality covers an area of 8,012 km^{2}. It is the eleventh largest municipality by size, but has one of the smallest populations.

The municipality has not been affected by the two local government reforms of the 20th century, but has had its large size since the municipal system was implemented in 1863.

The name appears to stem from the Sami word sourge, which means branch, and sel, which is of Swedish origin and refers to a kind of stream. This refers to the protected Vindel River (Swedish: Vindelälven), which flows through the town and municipality of Sorsele.

Geography wise, around half of the municipal area is part of the Vindelfjällens Nature Reserve.

== Localities ==
There is only one locality (or urban area) in Sorsele Municipality:

#	Locality	Population
1	Sorsele	1,288

== Demographics ==
This is a demographic table based on Sorsele Municipality's electoral districts in the 2022 Swedish general election sourced from SVT's election platform, in turn taken from SCB official statistics.

In total there were 2,461 residents, including 1,843 Swedish citizens of voting age. 56.6% voted for the left coalition and 42.4% for the right coalition. Indicators are in percentage points except population totals and income.

Location	Residents	Citizen adults	Left vote	Right vote	Employed	Swedish parents	Foreign heritage	Income SEK	Degree
Location			%	%					
Gargnäs	420	311	55.2	43.8	78	78	22	19,821	30
Sorsele	2,041	1,532	56.5	42.6	86	88	12	22,985	26
Source: SVT
