= Sorsele =

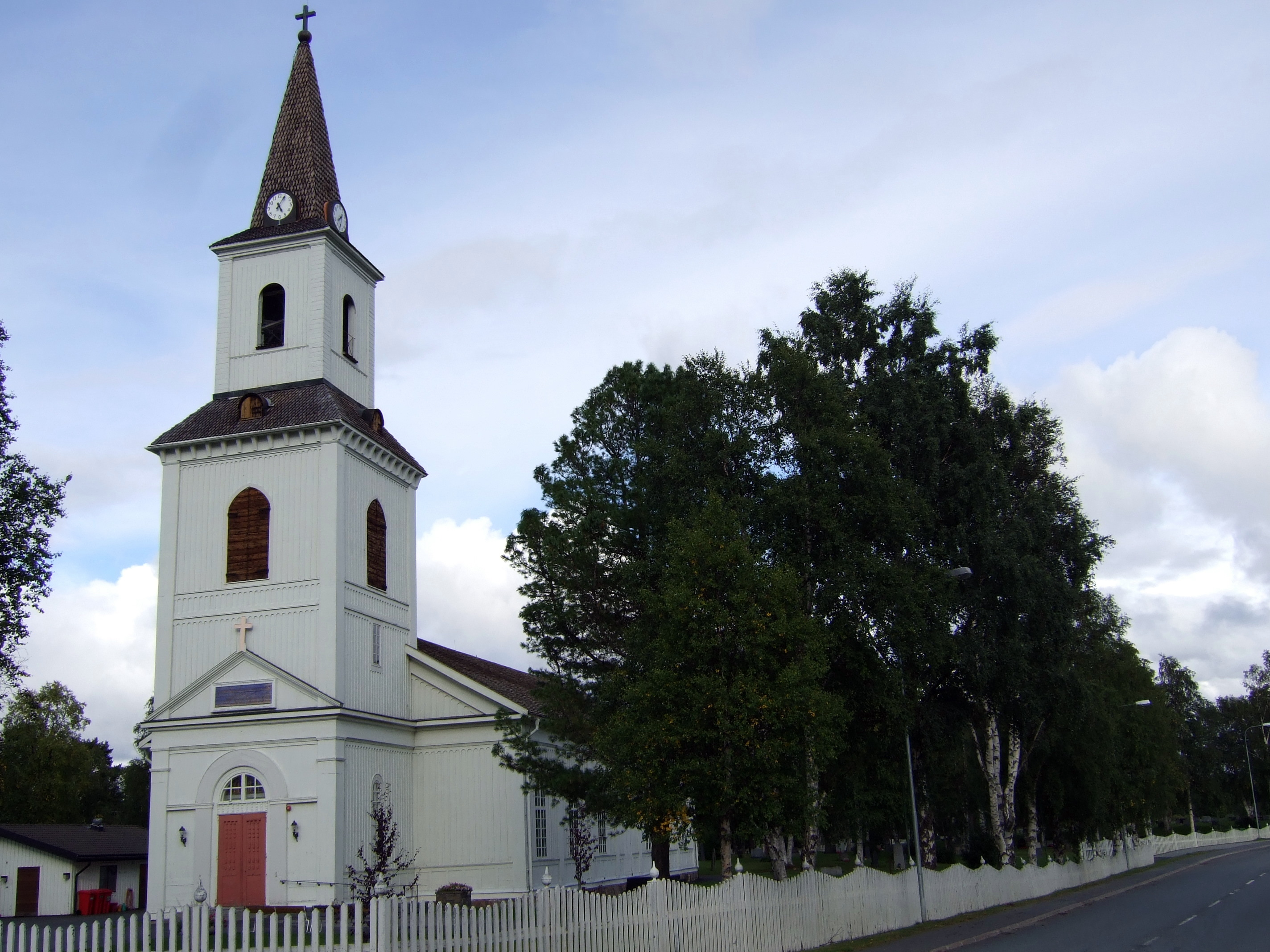
- Sorsele Church in August 2008

- Location within Västerbotten Location within Sweden
- Coordinates: 65°32′N 17°32′E
- Country: Sweden
- Province: Lapland
- County: Västerbotten County
- Municipality: Sorsele Municipality

Area
  - Total: 1.82 km^{2} (0.70 sq mi)

Population (December 31, 2010)
  - Total: 1,277
  - Density: 701/km^{2} (1,820/sq mi)
- Time zone: UTC+1 (CET)
  - Summer (DST): UTC+2 (CEST)

Sorsele (Swedish pronunciation: [ˈsɔ̌ʂːɛlɛ]; Southern Sami: Suarsa; Ume Sami: Suorssá) is a locality and the seat of Sorsele Municipality in Västerbotten County, province of Lapland, Sweden with 1,277 inhabitants in 2010. Sorsele is also the nearest town to the ski resort Nalovardo. It is known for containing a portion of the Vindelfjällen Nature Reserve, one of the largest nature reserves in Sweden.

Mercedes-Benz operate winter driving events on a series of Hermann Tilke-designed snow/ice courses in the area.

== History ==
The name contains the suffix "sel," meaning 'calm water.' The prefix is a Swedish adaptation of the Sámi word "Soursså," which in turn may come from an older Swedish name, "Sörsele." Another explanation is that Sorsele comes from the Sámi "Suörke-suulë," which means "Branch Island" (since the Vindel River branches around Sorsele Island, where the church site is located).

Sorsele is the parish center of Sorsele Parish and was part of the Sorsele Rural Municipality after the municipal reform of 1862. On November 15, 1935, Sorsele Municipal Community was established for the locality, which was dissolved at the end of 1955. Since 1971, the locality has been part of Sorsele Municipality as its central locality.

== Climate ==
Climate data for Sorsele 1991−2020 (350m)
Month	Jan	Feb	Mar	Apr	May	Jun	Jul	Aug	Sep	Oct	Nov	Dec	Year
Record high °C (°F)	7.7 (45.9)	7.6 (45.7)	11.5 (52.7)	18.6 (65.5)	26.6 (79.9)	29.9 (85.8)	30.5 (86.9)	29.8 (85.6)	23.5 (74.3)	18.2 (64.8)	11.7 (53.1)	8.5 (47.3)	30.5 (86.9)
Mean daily maximum °C (°F)	−6.9 (19.6)	−6.0 (21.2)	−0.3 (31.5)	5.2 (41.4)	11.3 (52.3)	16.7 (62.1)	19.6 (67.3)	17.5 (63.5)	11.8 (53.2)	4.1 (39.4)	−2.5 (27.5)	−5.5 (22.1)	5.4 (41.8)
Daily mean °C (°F)	−11.6 (11.1)	−11.3 (11.7)	−6.1 (21.0)	0.3 (32.5)	6.2 (43.2)	11.7 (53.1)	14.6 (58.3)	12.5 (54.5)	7.5 (45.5)	0.8 (33.4)	−5.9 (21.4)	−9.6 (14.7)	0.8 (33.4)
Mean daily minimum °C (°F)	−16.4 (2.5)	−16.5 (2.3)	−11.9 (10.6)	−5.1 (22.8)	0.9 (33.6)	6.7 (44.1)	9.9 (49.8)	8.0 (46.4)	3.6 (38.5)	−2.3 (27.9)	−9.3 (15.3)	−13.9 (7.0)	−3.9 (25.1)
Record low °C (°F)	−39.2 (−38.6)	−40.6 (−41.1)	−37.3 (−35.1)	−25.1 (−13.2)	−11.5 (11.3)	−1.0 (30.2)	0.0 (32.0)	−2.5 (27.5)	−8.5 (16.7)	−23.2 (−9.8)	−32.5 (−26.5)	−37.9 (−36.2)	−40.6 (−41.1)
Average precipitation mm (inches)	43.0 (1.69)	30.5 (1.20)	28.5 (1.12)	26.7 (1.05)	40.9 (1.61)	67.3 (2.65)	90.1 (3.55)	78.9 (3.11)	53.4 (2.10)	48.9 (1.93)	47.0 (1.85)	43.4 (1.71)	598.6 (23.57)
Source: SMHI

== Twin towns ==
- Kyyjärvi, Finland
