= Vindelfjällen Nature Reserve =

Nature reserve in Sweden

- IUCN category Ib (wilderness area)
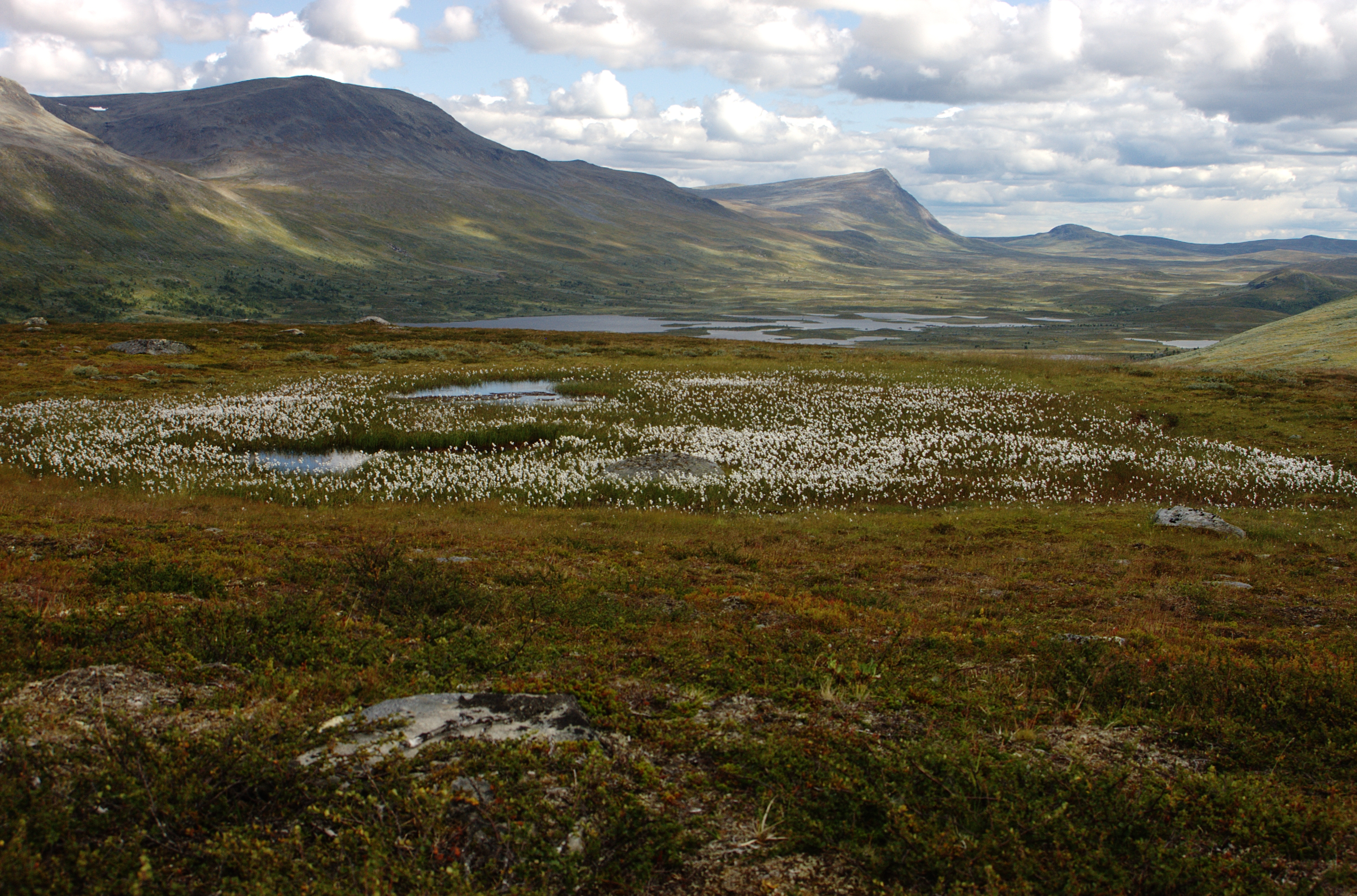
- Interactive map of Vindelfjällen Nature Reserve
- Coordinates: 65.923056°N 15.317778°E
- Area: 562,772 hectares (2,172.87 sq mi; 1,390,640 acres; 5,627.72 km^{2})
- Established: 1974
- Visitors: 412,000 (in 2000)
- Governing body: county of Västerbotten

Ramsar Wetland
- Official name: Tärnasjön
- Designated: 5 December 1974
- Reference no.: 29

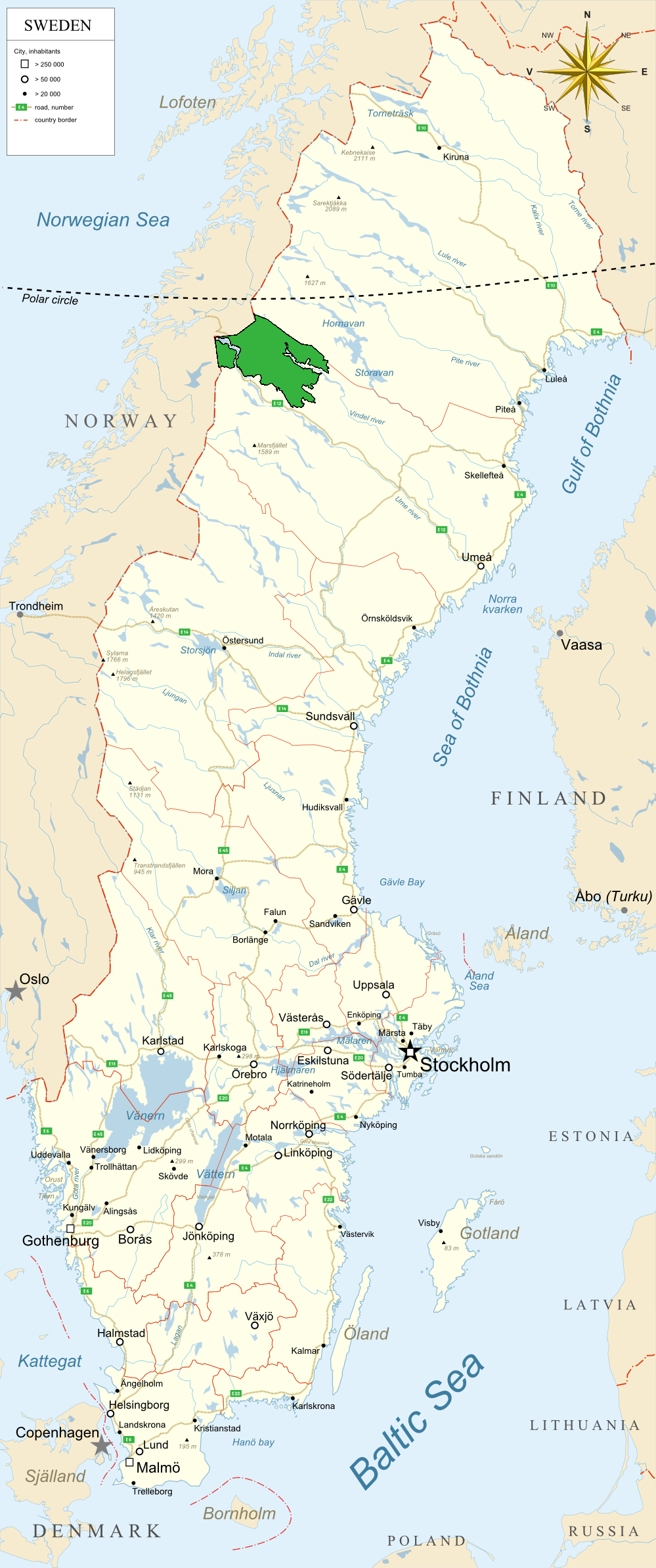
Vindelfjällen Nature Reserve (green area) in Northern Sweden

The Vindelfjällen Nature Reserve (Swedish: Vindelfjällens naturreservat) is a nature reserve located in the municipalities of Sorsele and Storuman in Västerbotten County of Swedish Lapland. It is the largest natural reserve in Sweden and one of the largest protected areas in Europe, totaling 562,772 ha (approx. 5,628 km^{2}).

Most of the reserve is made up of several Scandinavian Mountains, the main ones being Artfjället, Norra Storfjället, Ammarfjället and Björkfjället. Most of the landscapes of the Swedish mountains are represented. This ranges from the pronounced alpine character of Norra Storfjället, which includes the highlight of the reserve, the Norra Sytertoppen (1,768 m), to the plateau and plains near the base of the mountains. The differences in elevation highlight the diversity of rocks in the mountains. Among the mountains are the valleys and waterways of the Ume River drainage basin. This includes a portion of the Vindel River, after which the reserve is named. Towards the east, the elevation decreases and the mountains give way to the Lapland Plains.

This landscape diversity also includes biodiversity. The reserve covers the primary forests of the Nordic taiga in the eastern plains to alpine tundra and birch forests in the west. In addition, it houses a large number of wetlands, which are home to an abundance of bird species, especially at Marsivagge and around the lake Tärnasjön, the latter recognized as a Ramsar site. The mountains are also home to the arctic fox, a critically endangered species in Scandinavia and one of the symbols of the reserve.

The region has been populated since the end of the last ice age or about 9000 years. Originally, it was inhabited by speakers of Paleo-Laplandic Languages, who were not Sámi or Norse, likely descendants of the Scandinavian Hunter Gatherers. They initially lived by gathering and hunting, especially deer, but over time the material culture shifted to one based on breeding and ranching, showing evidence of transhumance movements. This shift is associated with the introduction of Sámi place names and culture; though this lifestyle left few traces, but some traps, old foundations, tombs and various artifacts have been found scattered throughout the landscape. Although partly translated into Swedish, geographic names in the region offer some information on the life and culture of the Sámi. The Swedes started to colonize the area in the eighteenth century, encouraged by incentives from the state. The population in the current reserve boundaries, however, remained minimal. In the middle of the twentieth century, the hydroelectric industry expanded to the north of the country and tried to exploit the Vindel River for electric power, but environmental protests managed to protect the river and its watershed. In 1974, the reserve was established, protecting the unspoiled nature of the mountains of Vindel River watershed. In 1988, the reserve was extended to protect the primary forests of the foothills. Recently there has been discussions regarding transforming the nature reserve into a national park to improve the protection of the area.

In addition to the inhabitants, the reserve sees considerable activity from tourists both in winter and summer. Hiking is one of the main activities, especially along the well known Kungsleden trail, which crosses the reserve along its length. The summer roads are also often used for cross-country ski trails or snowmobile trails in winter. Finally many ecotourism activities are offered by various tourism businesses. Besides tourism, traditional activities such as reindeer herding, by the Sámi, and hunting and fishing are still practiced. Finally, the mountains are widely used for scientific research, which is facilitated by the presence of an on-site research station.

== Toponymy ==
The word Vindel derives from the word vindill, which is similar to vända, the Swedish verb meaning to turn or change direction, probably in reference to the meandering nature of the Vindel river. In Swedish Vindelfjällen means 'the Vindel mountains', which is reasonable given that the Vindel River has its source in these mountains.

As in other areas of the Lapland mountains, the reserve has a number of Sámi names. However, unlike the mountains further North, here they live among places with numerous Swedish names. For example, the words fjäll ('mountain'), sjö/vatten ('lake'), å/älv ('river'), etc. are frequently seen. This is a result of early Swedish settlers translating Sámi names into Swedish as well as these settlers naming previously unnamed geographic features.

== Geography ==
Map of the reserve

=== Location and boundaries ===
The reserve is located in the municipalities of Sorsele and Storuman in the northwest of Västerbotten County and in the south of the historic province of Lapland, Sweden. It forms approximately a rectangle extended in a predominantly east-west axis. The western boundary is the Norwegian border, while its northern border is the border with Norrbotten County, located approximately along the crest of the Björkfjället mountain range. This rectangle is fragmented by two roads that are excluded from the reserve. To the west, the European route E12, of which this section is called Blå vägen ('the blue route'), cuts the reserve into two parts, isolating the Artfjället mountain range from the rest of the reserve. To the east, Länsväg (equivalent of "county road") 363 penetrates deep into the Vindelälven valley to Ammarnäs and thus creates a notch in the reserve. In total, the reserve has an area of 562,772 hectares (over 5,600 km^{2}), making it the largest nature reserve in Sweden and one of the largest protected areas in Europe. The reserve Vindelfjällen is bordered to the northeast by the Laisdalen Nature Reserve (Laisdalen fjällurskog) in the County of Norrbotten. The Pieljekaise National Park (Sweden) and the Saltfjellet–Svartisen National Park (Norway) are also nearby.

=== Relief ===
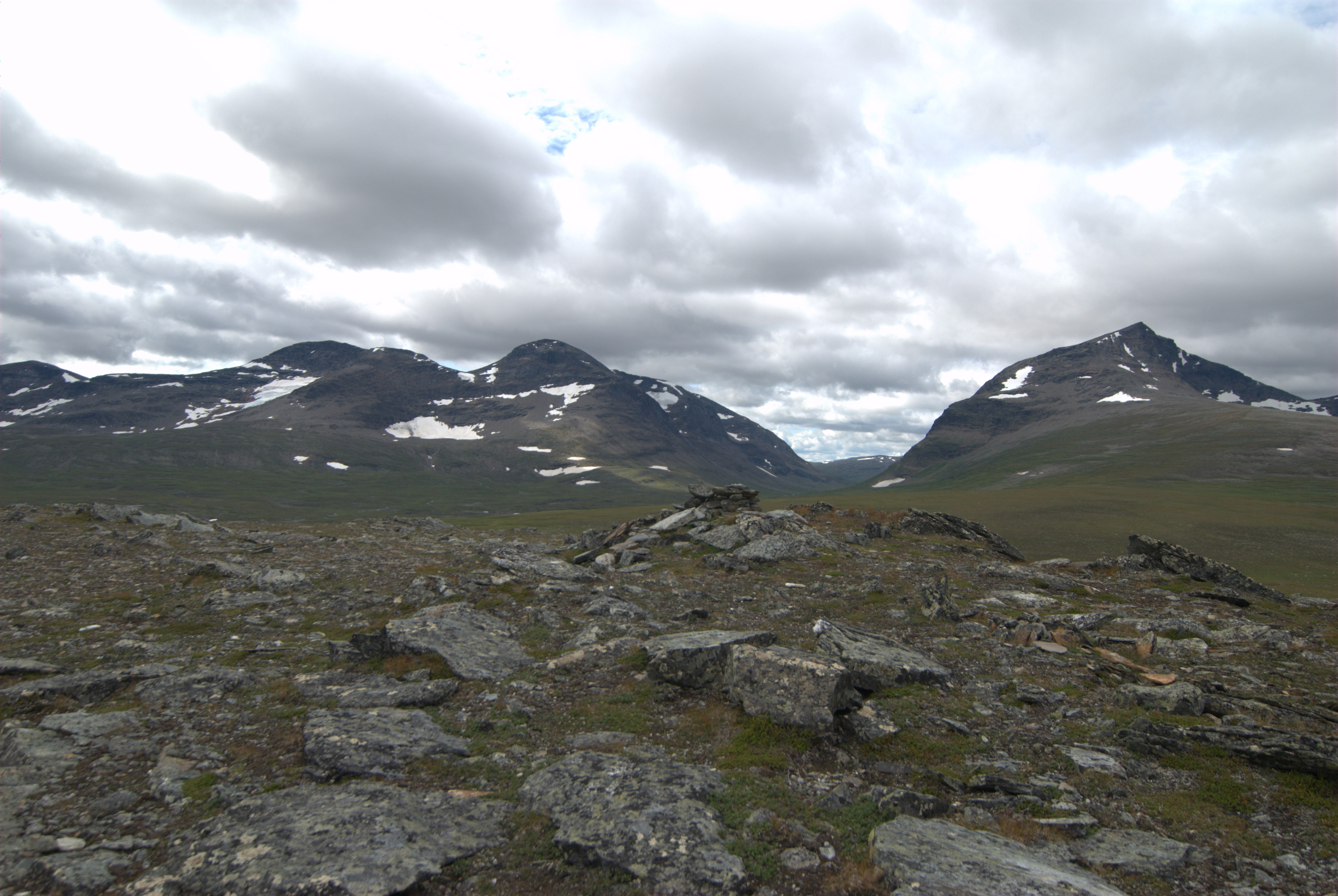
The Norra Storfjället mountain range seen from the east, with the Swedish: Syterskalet valley and the Swedish: Norra Sytertoppen summit to the right

The Vindelfjällen reserve includes most types of Swedish landscapes; mountains, high plains to alpine peaks, passing through plateaus or rounded profile mountain ranges.

At the heart of the alpine region of the reserve is the Norra Storfjället mountain range. This mountain range includes the highest peaks, including Norra Sytertoppen, which from its height of 1,768 m is the highest point of the reserve as well as Västerbotten County. Other notable peaks of the mountain range are Måskostjakke (1,690 m) and Södra Sytertoppen (1685 m). The mountain range is cut down the middle by the narrow, deep valley of Syterskalet/Viterskalet, which is one of the icons of the reserve and is sometimes compared to the famous Lapporten by its symmetrical profile.

The rest of the reserve consists of rolling hills and numerous emerging mountain ranges. At the western end of the reserve is that of Artfjället, culminating at 1,471 m. Artfjället consists of several sharp mountain ridges, as well as some rounded peaks. Centrally in the reserve is the Ammarfjället mountain range, with a peak plateau reaching its maximum at Rerrogaise (1,611 m). northeast, the Björkfjället mountain range forms the border of the reserve and the county. All in all, it has an average altitude of 800–900 m with the highest peak within the reserve being Vuorektjåkkå (1,245 m).

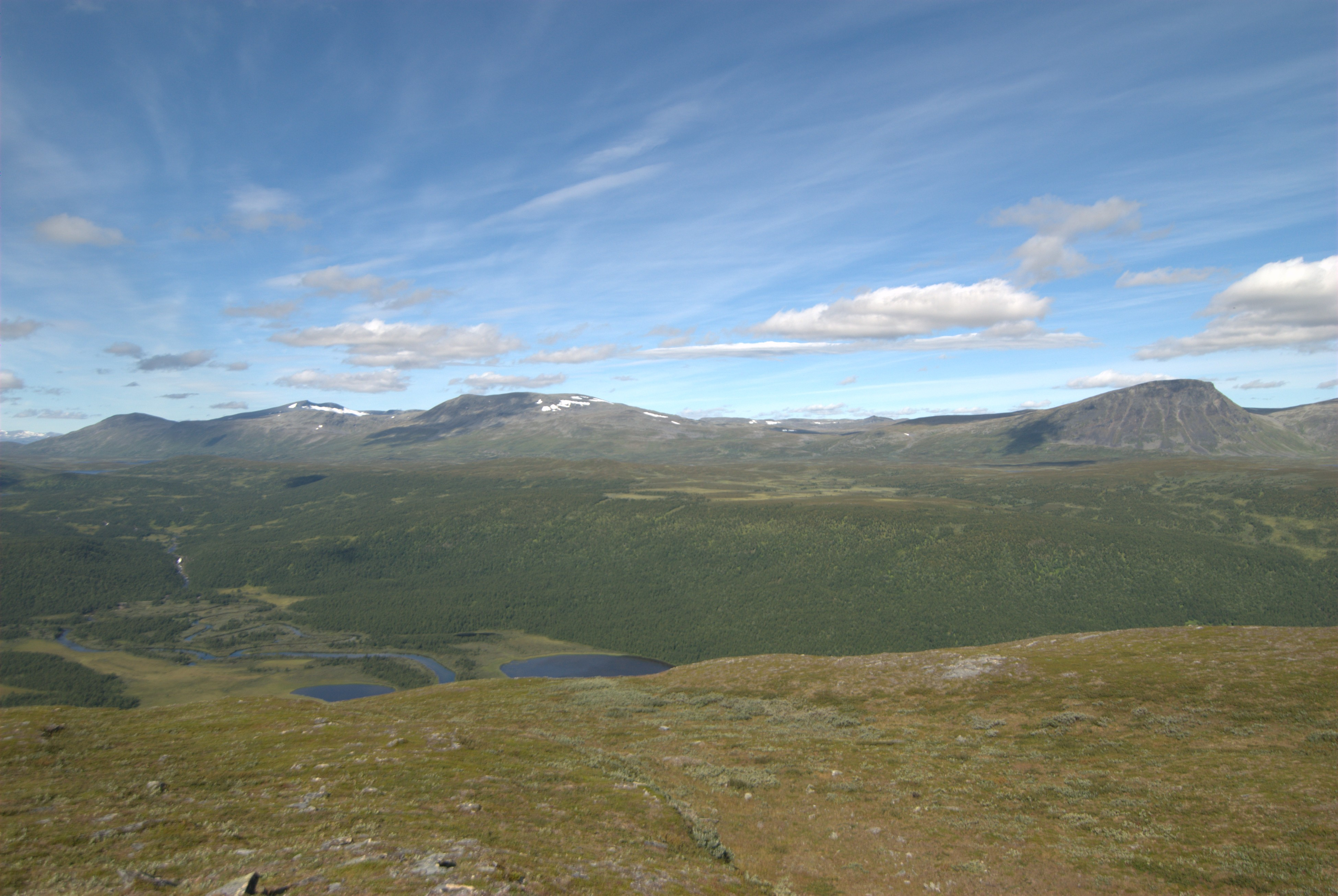
The softer landscape of the Ammarfjället mountain range with the Tjulträsk valley in the foreground.

Intersecting the various mountain ranges are several valleys and lowlands. One of the main valleys of the reserve is the Vindelälven River Valley, although the entire section south of Ammarnäs is largely excluded from the reserve. The northern section of the valley is quite sunken, surrounded by the Ammarfjället and Björkfjället mountain ranges and the valley widens when approaching Ammarnäs. The lowest point of the reserve, at 345 m above sea level, is located south of the valley, at the shores of Lake Storvindeln. At the center of the reserve is another large area of low altitude around Lake Tärnasjön. The terrain is flat, which has led to the formation of a vast network of wetlands.

Finally, going east, in the sections added during the extension of the reserve in 1988, the altitude gradually decreases to reach the plain.

=== Climate ===
The climate of the reserve has important contrasts. The western part is strongly influenced by humid air from the nearby Atlantic Ocean. It brings more mild temperatures in winter, while maintaining freshness in summer. The nearby Atlantic also provides a significant amount of rainfall. But the Norra Storfjället and mountains in its continuity to the north together with the Ammarfjället mountain range protect the eastern part of the reserve from the prevailing winds from west/southwest. This blocks the oceanic influence and creates a more continental climate. Thus, the Ammarnäs region, located in the rain shadow, receives less than 600 mm of precipitation per year, whereas Hemavan, not far away but located on the western side of Norra Storfjället, receives about 750 mm. In the mountains themselves, the amount of precipitation reaches 1200 mm in places. The growing season in Sweden, defined as the number of days when the average temperature exceed 5 °C, is about 120 days. Because of cooler temperatures, much of this precipitation is in the form of snow. The first snow fall, on average, is in early October in the middle of the valleys and snow cover usually persists until early June.

Climate data for Vindel-Björkheden 1991-2020 normals (350m)
Month	Jan	Feb	Mar	Apr	May	Jun	Jul	Aug	Sep	Oct	Nov	Dec	Year
Mean daily maximum °C (°F)	−6.8 (19.8)	−6.0 (21.2)	−1.0 (30.2)	4.5 (40.1)	10.4 (50.7)	16.0 (60.8)	19.0 (66.2)	17.0 (62.6)	11.5 (52.7)	3.9 (39.0)	−2.4 (27.7)	−5.2 (22.6)	5.1 (41.1)
Daily mean °C (°F)	−12.4 (9.7)	−11.9 (10.6)	−6.8 (19.8)	−0.7 (30.7)	5.0 (41.0)	10.4 (50.7)	13.4 (56.1)	11.6 (52.9)	6.8 (44.2)	0.3 (32.5)	−6.6 (20.1)	−10.2 (13.6)	−0.1 (31.8)
Mean daily minimum °C (°F)	−16.5 (2.3)	−16.6 (2.1)	−12.5 (9.5)	−6.1 (21.0)	−0.1 (31.8)	5.6 (42.1)	8.9 (48.0)	7.1 (44.8)	3.1 (37.6)	−2.7 (27.1)	−9.6 (14.7)	−13.9 (7.0)	−4.4 (24.0)
Average precipitation mm (inches)	48.5 (1.91)	37.0 (1.46)	34.5 (1.36)	27.6 (1.09)	38.5 (1.52)	66.5 (2.62)	95.5 (3.76)	79.8 (3.14)	59.2 (2.33)	51.7 (2.04)	50.2 (1.98)	49.0 (1.93)	638 (25.14)
Source: NOAA

=== Hydrography ===
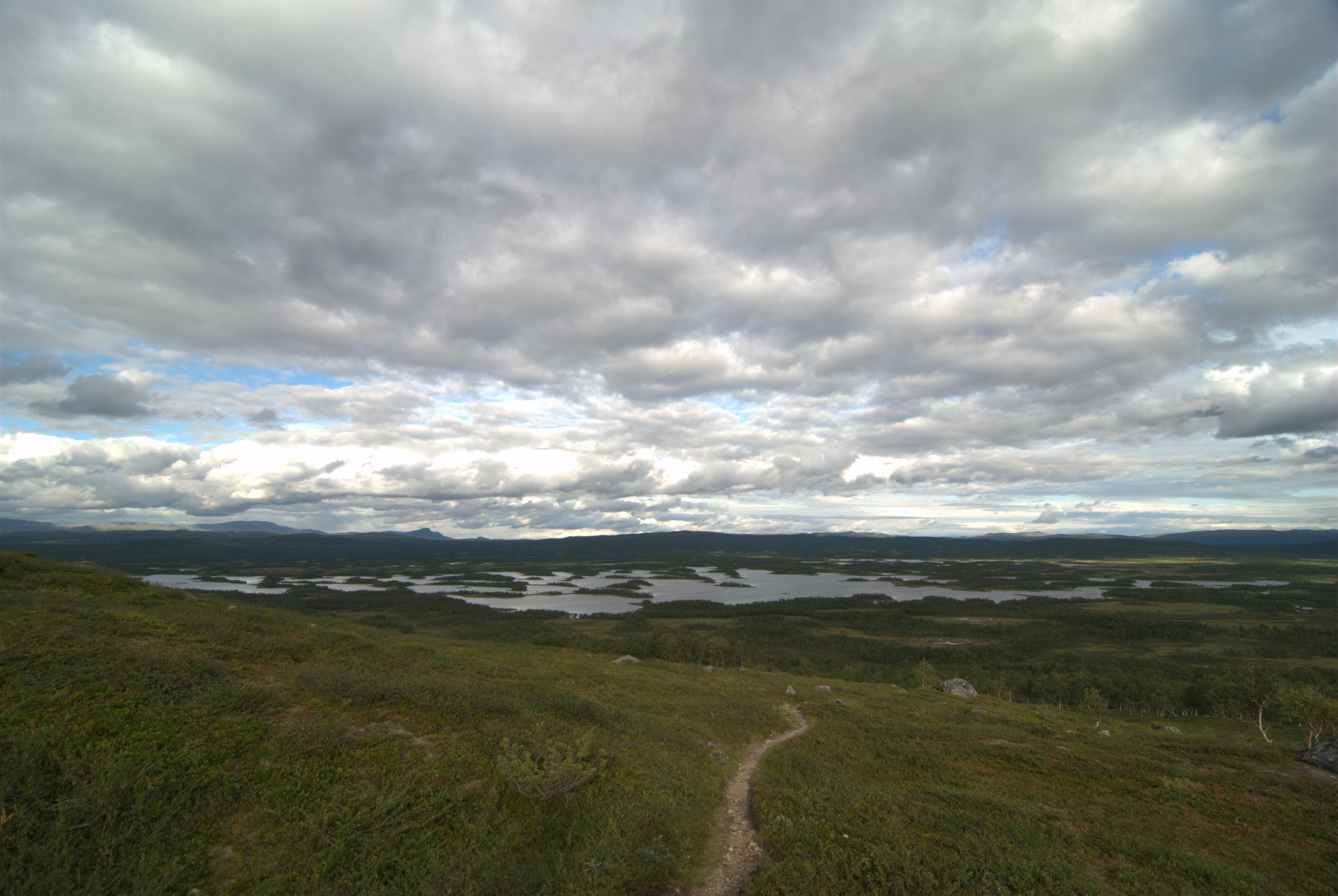
A maze of islands in the southern part of Lake Tärnasjön

The Vindelfjällen mountains have a rich river system flowing through it. The reserve covers a large part of the mountainous section of the Ume River watershed and protects the Vindel River, the main tributary of the watershed. The Vindel River is one of four "national rivers" with the Torne River, Kalix River and the Pite River: four great rivers of northern Sweden whose watershed is fully protected against the construction of dams and whose flow is currently unregulated. The Vindel River forms a large number of rapids upstream from Ammarnäs.

There are several other major rivers in the reserve. The Tjulån River originates at the Tjulträsk lakes and joins the Vindel River in Ammarnäs. The Juktån River passes the great lake Överst Juktan and continues outside the reserve to Ume River for a total length of 170 km. Finally the Tärnaån River originates at Lake Tärnasjön before joining into the Ume River just outside the reserve. The Ume River itself is located outside the reserve, between the Artfjället mountain ranges and the rest of the reserve and unlike the rivers within the reserve, its waters have been regulated and used for hydroelectric power.

The reserve has several lakes, the largest of which often have an elongated shape, following the topography of the valleys. The two largest lakes are Överst-Juktan and Tärnasjön, both measuring about 20 km long. The Tärnasjön is particularly notable for the large number of small islands in the southern third of the lake, forming a mosaic of water and forest, which extends south of the lake to one of the largest wetlands reserves. Another vast wetland, Laivamyren, is located north of the lake. It covers no less than 20 km^{2} and includes the remains of the southernmost palsas of Sweden. Another wetland of importance, though less extensive, is Marsivagge in Ammarfjället mountain range. Finally, many wetlands are scattered in areas of lower elevations in the east.

Finally, water is found in the form of glaciers in areas where the altitude exceeds 1,600 m, or in other words, in the Norra Storfjället mountain range and more locally in Ammarfjället. Glacier names include Murtserglaciären, Måskonåiveglaciären, Norra Syterglaciären, Tärnaglaciären, Östra and Västra Skrapetjakkeglaciären, and Östra Syterglaciären, all of which have been studied since the late nineteenth century.

== Geology ==
=== Formation ===
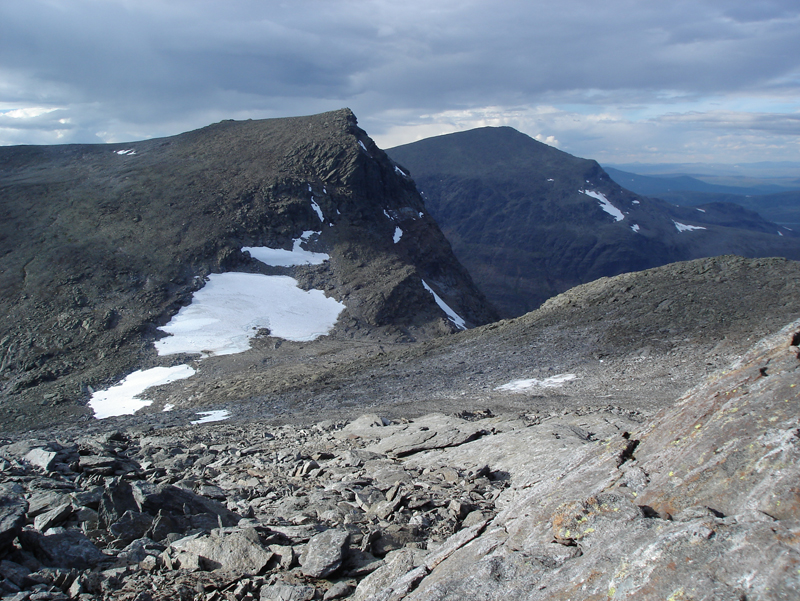
Södra Sytertoppen in the foreground and Norra Sytertoppen in the background.

Vindelfjällen is part of the Scandinavian Mountains, reminiscent of the Caledonian belt. The latter is also the origin of the mountains of Scotland, Ireland, Greenland and Svalbard. The Caledonian orogeny is the era associated with the collision of Laurentia and Baltica plates peak between 420 and 400 MYA, with the disappearance of the Iapetus Ocean by subduction. During this event, crust fragments overlap, forming thrust sheets. Among these layers, one in particular, the Seve-Köli layer, consists largely of the oceanic crust. These layers can be found embedded within the mountain range (ophiolite). They consist of different rocks: the Seve layer is primarily composed of hard rock such as amphibolite and gabbros or very hard varieties of mica, while the Köli layer principally comprises soft rocks such as shale. This sheet of Seve-Köli dominates the geology of the reserve, the main exception being the area ranging from the Artfjället mountain ranges to Lake Övre Ältsvattnet, which consists of the Rödingsfjäll layer, rich in limestone. In Ammarnäs and other places, a middle layer dominated by phyllite, can be seen, like a window through the Seve-Koli layer.

The mountainous chain has been continuously eroded to form a peneplain. However, from about 60 Ma (Cenozoic), Scandinavian peneplane has undergone extensive tectonic uplift. Causes for this are not clear and several hypotheses have been proposed. One theory is the influence of the Icelandic plume could have raised the crust. Another hypothesis suggests that isostasy related to glaciations may have occurred. Whatever the cause, the uprising allowed the ancient channel to rise to more than 2000m at times.

=== Geomorphology ===
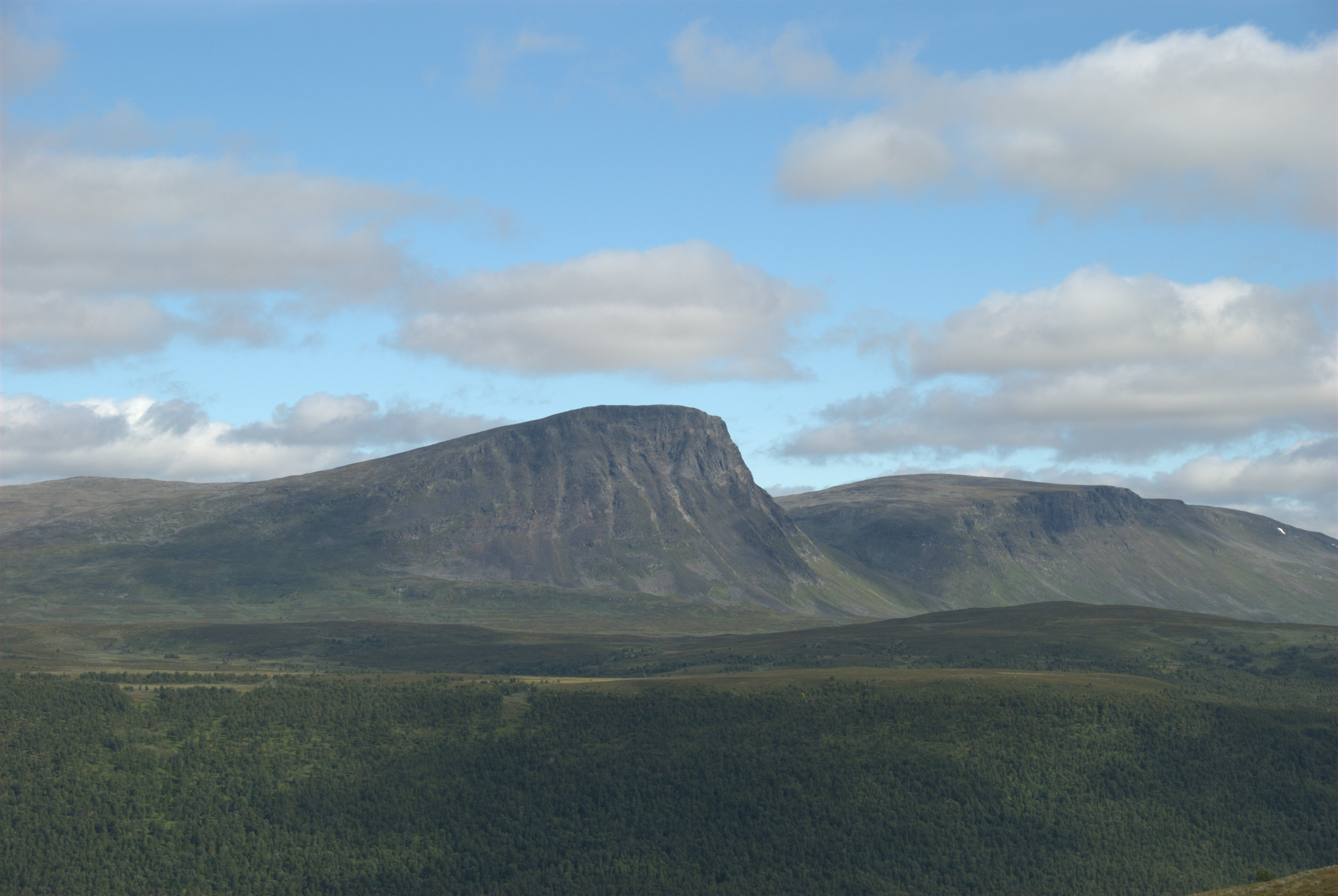
The presence of hard rock protrusions created in the landscape, known as the amphibolites of Sulåive. In addition, the orientation of geological cause slopes east (to the right of the image) significantly more steep while the western slopes are gentler slopes.

While the Scandinavian Mountains gradually increase altitude, erosion can negate this slow growth. While this includes river erosion, the glacial erosion, especially during the great glaciations of the Quaternary (from 1.5 Ma) has had the most influence on the current geomorphology of the chain and the reserve. Glaciers grew and invaded the valleys, and then gradually unified to form a continuous ice sheet that completely covered the area. The nature of the rocks had a considerable influence on amount of glacial erosion. Most of soft rocks of Koli layer were quickly eroded while the rocks of the Seve layer were more resistant to erosion. Thus, the peaks of Stor-Aigert, as well as the Ammarfjället, Rerrogaise, Sulåive and Stubebakte mountain ranges currently consist of amphibolites and have steep reliefs. Similarly, the highest points of the Artfjället and Norra Storfjället mountain ranges consist largely of gabbros. The general direction of water flow also affects the relief: the layers tend to rise from west to east, which implies that the west-facing slopes are gentle in general, while the eastern slopes are often steep. The most visible signs of the glacial morphology are glacial valleys and U-valleys, such as Syterskalet, the top of the Vindelälven Valley, Skebleskalet, etc. There are also some forty small glacial craters or niches, most facing east, on the leeward side.

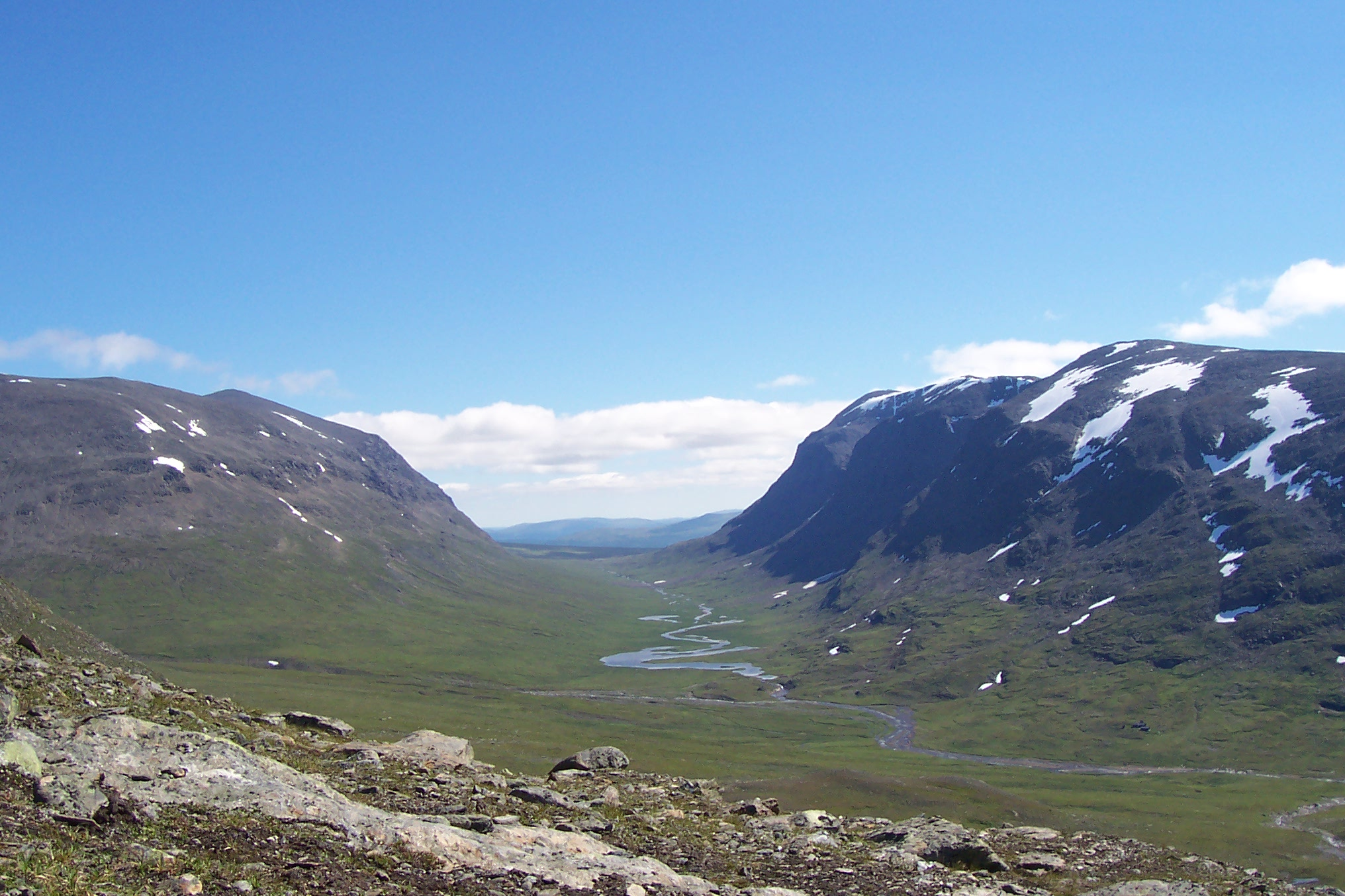
The valley of Syterskalet

When glaciers retreated at the end of the last ice age, the large ice sheet to the east often survived longer than that of the mountain valleys. As a result, several lakes were formed as the water was trapped between the mountains to the west and glaciers to the east. Lakes such as Marsivagge Lake at Tjulträsk and Tärnasjön Lake have left alluvial terraces. For example, an alluvial terrace can be seen northwest of Tärnasjön at an altitude of about 700 m. The retreat of glaciers also spread moraines of different types in the landscape. Besides the terminal moraines, there is also an excellent example of Rogen moraine responsible for the archipelago south of Lake Tärnasjön. A well formed moraine over 3 km long can be seen on the west side of the valley Marsivagge; its origin is still not well understood. A few eskers can also be found in some areas of the reserve.

The area of Artfjället – Övre Ältsvattnet is found outside of the glacial formations, and represents a karst topography. Besides the underground sinkholes and streams, the most remarkable feature of these karst formations are the caves, which are among the largest in Sweden.

== Natural environment ==
Map of the vegetation steps in the reserve

The Vindelfjällen nature reserve includes almost all natural environments of the Scandinavian Mountains. It is, according to the WWF classification, straddling terrestrial ecoregions of Scandinavian Birch Forest, Scandinavian plains, and Russian Taiga. In total, the reserve has about 500 km^{2} of primary coniferous forests, over 1600 km^{2} of birch forests (the largest protected birch forest in Sweden), nearly 1600 km^{2} of alpine moorland and nearly 300 km^{2} peatland Among the several habitats are permanent glaciers, alpine rivers, palsa mires, alpine and boreal heaths and grasslands, mountain hay meadows, and natural rivers

Many of the species living in the reserve are included in the Habitats Directive and the Birds Directive of the European Union and / or are considered threatened at the national or international level, which justifies the classification of the reserve in the Natura 2000 network as important bird area. In addition, Lake Tärnasjön is classified as a Ramsar site (an area of 11 800 ha).

=== Flora ===
==== Taiga ====
The Scandinavian taiga coniferous forest consists mainly of Scots pine (Pinus sylvestris) and Norway spruce (Picea abies). Within the reserve, however, spruce typically dominates, and pine is found in only localized areas. Taiga grows primarily at altitudes below 600 m, but some isolated spruce are found among the birches further upstream forests in the valleys.

The reserve did not initially include the taiga zone of the Juktån Valley, but the extension in 1988 brought in three new taiga areas: Giertsbäcksdalen, Matsorkliden and Kirjesålandet. These rich forests needed protection within the reserve and are especially valuable due to the nature of being primary forests, in other words, they have never been harvested. These primary forests are also important for numerous species, many of which are threatened by the intensive deforestation of the taiga. From the foot of the Swedish mountains and along the entire length of the chain, these forests create a valuable continuity, essential for the survival of several species here. Finally, while the remaining primary forests are often on nutrient-poor substrate, certain areas of the reserve are considered productive, especially Kirjesålandet, ideally exposed to the southwest and thus offering an ecological niche for unique flora. Near the mountain, fires are less frequent than in the plains to the east.

In terms of vegetation, the forests are home to a number of relatively rare or endangered species of lichens and lignicolous fungi.

==== Birch forests ====
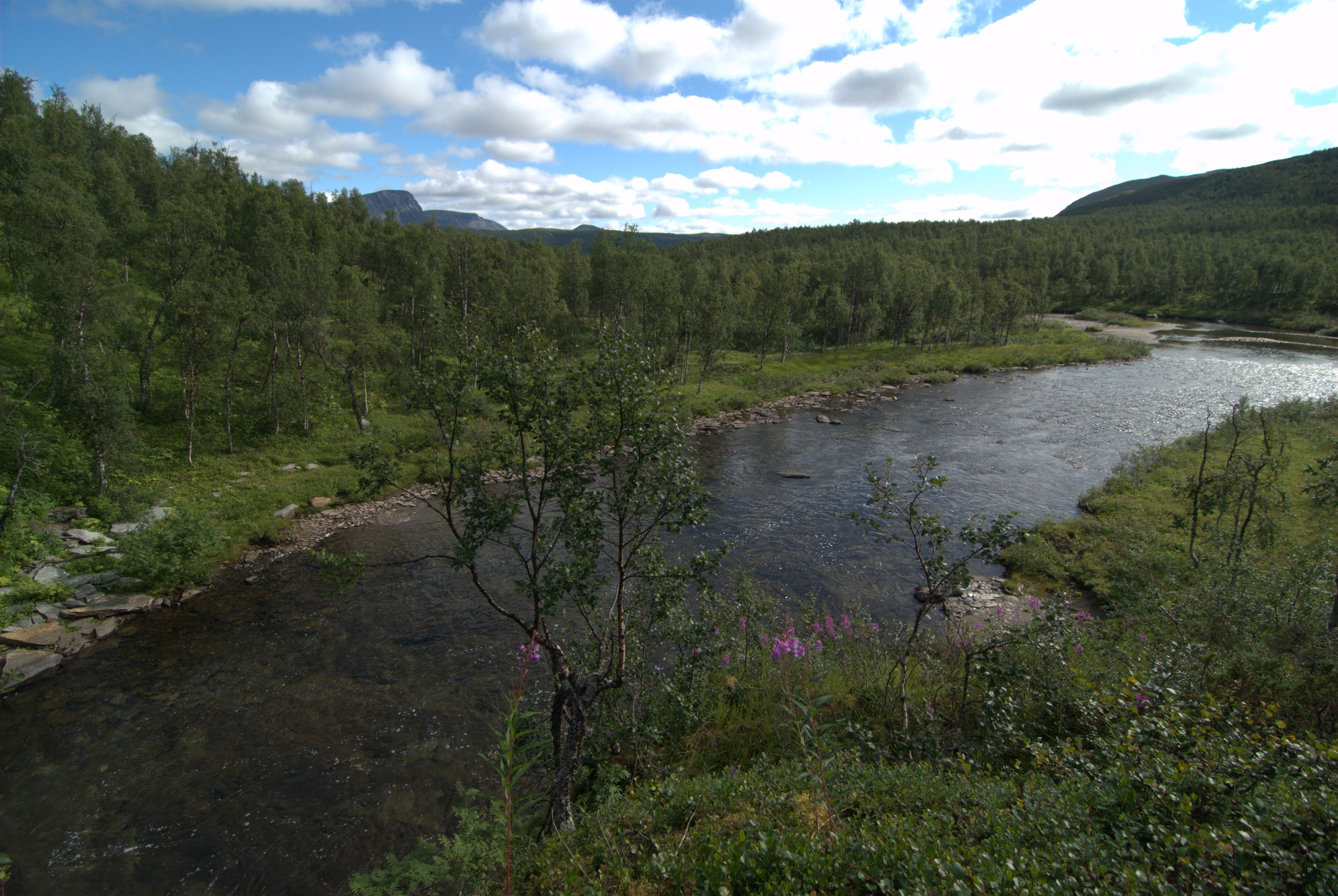
Birch tree forest in Tjulträsk Valley

Birch forests are a characteristic feature of the subalpine Scandinavian Mountains. These are a subspecies of downy birch (Betula pubescens) often called crooked birch (Betula pubescens subsp. Tortuosa) because of its shape. These forests start at the limit of conifers (between 500 and 600 m) and form the tree line at an altitude of about 800 m, though this is quite variable depending on the locality. They thus constitute the dominant middle of the reserve. Different types of birch forests can be classified based on the nature of the undergrowth; at Vindelfjällen, there are mainly so-called mossy birch forests and meadow birch forests. Lichen-rich forests, on the other hand, are rare in this area, but very common further north.

The moss-rich forests are the most common. Their undergrowth woods are dominated by mosses and blueberries (Vaccinium myrtillus) and low grasses. On the other hand, the prairie forests occur in areas where limestone is more common, such as the Artfjället mountain range or in sunny areas and with good access to water, such as on the north shore of Lake Stor-Tjulträsket, on the areas of the Vindel River valley facing south or near Aivak north of Lake Överst-Jukan. The undergrowth there are far richer, with diversity of grass species.

==== Wetlands ====
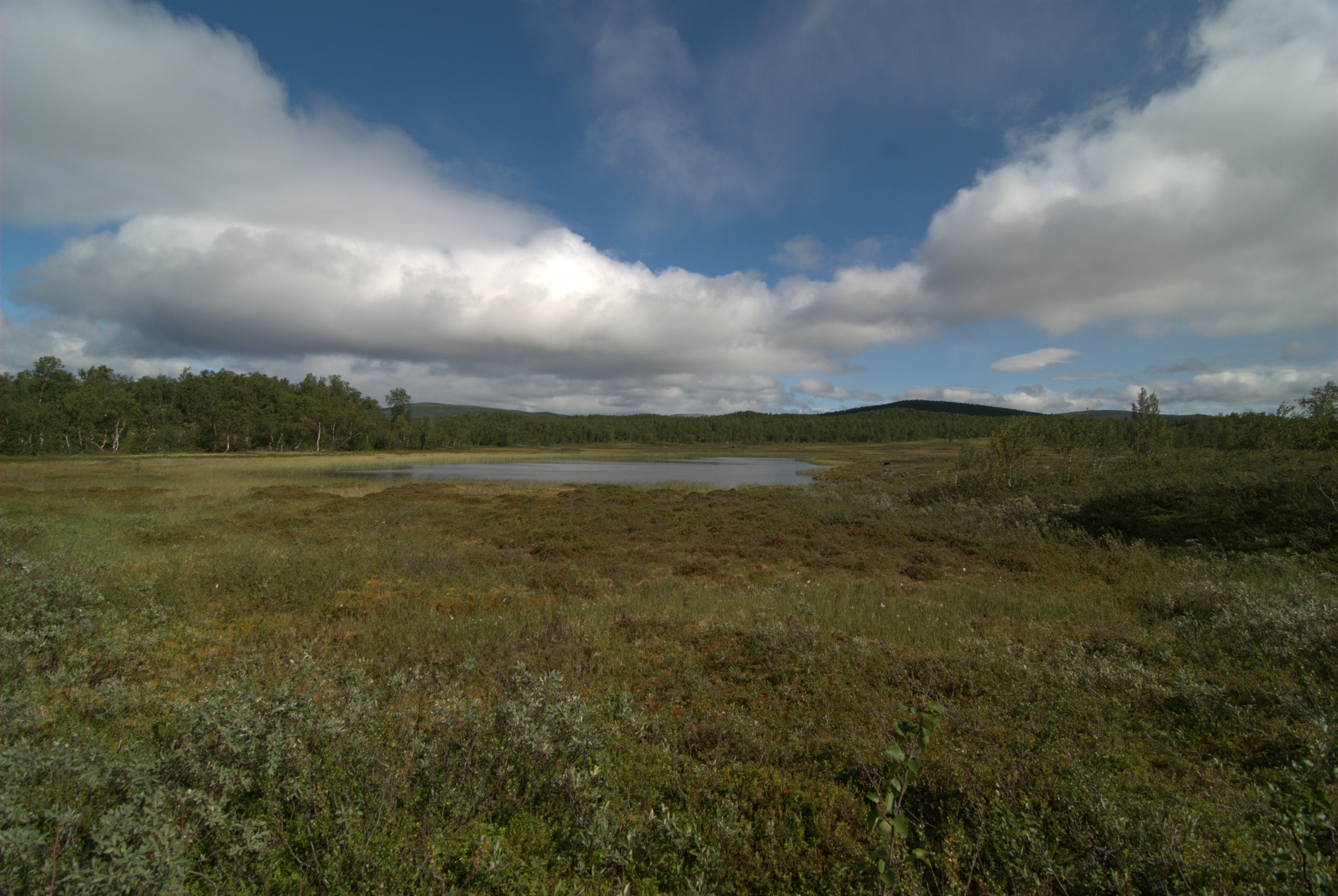
Wetlands near Lake Tärnasjön.

The reserve has many wetlands usually in subalpine regions. This is overwhelmingly aapa bogs, also called corded bogs, because of the form taken by these marshes. The main plants growing there are Sphagnum, sedges and willows, however there are also some peat dwarf birches, hare's-tail cottongrass (Eriophorum vaginatum), heather shrubs (Calluna vulgaris), bog blueberries (Vaccinium uliginosum) and cloudberries (Rubus chamaemorus)

==== Moorlands and meadows ====
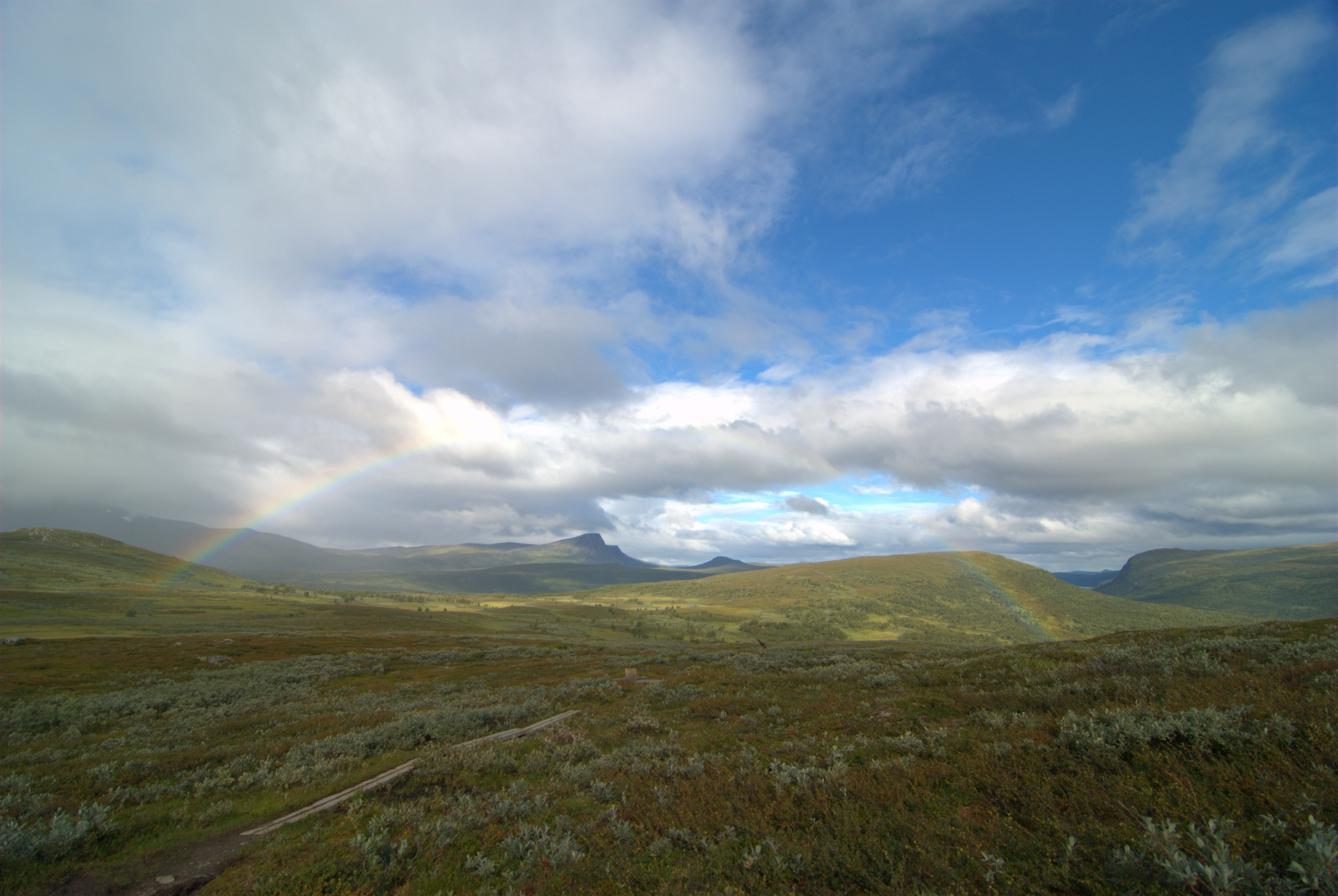
Willow bushes in the moorlands of Vindelfjällen along the Kungsleden trail between Tärnasjön and Serve

The alpine mainly consists of moorlands and alpine meadows. For convenience, it is categorized into lower, middle and upper alpine levels.

The lower alpine level is also called the willow level because of the presence of several species of willows, such as the downy willow (Salix lapponum) and gray willow (Salix glauca). These will often intermingle with dwarf birches (Betula nana), sometimes forming dense bushes These shrubs are usually located in the lower parts of the lower alpine, and act as a transition between the birch forests and higher altitude grassy moorlands. The European goldenrod (Solidago virgaurea) and blueberries are also found at this level. The birch forests are more sensitive and are strongly influenced by the local climate at this level. On dry land, crowberry (Empetrum nigrum) is a dominant species. In areas exposed to wind, only the dwarf azaleas (Kalmia procumbens) and alpine bearberry (Arctostaphylos alpina) develop. Conversely, in calcareous soils, moorlands and meadows shrubs such as the mountain avens (Dryas octopetala) are more abundant. This is particularly the case on the Artfjället mountain range, which is renowned for its rich flora. (Note: p. 132-134) In fact the name Artfjället may be translated as 'mountain of many species'. The meadows also display a multitude of colorful flora, including the wolf's-bane (Aconitum lycoctonum), the alpine sow-thistle (Cicerbita alpina), and the globeflower (Trollius europaeus)

In the medium alpine level, often defined as the region above the limit of blueberries, the number of species is greatly reduced and the ground is increasingly frayed. Only the most resilient plants thrive; such as dwarf azaleas, crowberry, the blue heath (Phyllodoce caerulea), the moss bell heather (Harrimanella hypnoides), the pincushion plant (Diapensia lapponica) and glacier buttercup (Ranunculus glacialis).

The plants that can survive in the upper alpine level (beyond 1300 m) are predominantly limited to mosses and lichens, though the buttercup glaciers are sometimes found at these altitudes as well.

=== Fauna ===
The levels of vegetation are also important for animals: species diversity is much greater at lower altitudes, especially in forests. However unlike plants, the animals are rarely restricted to a particular level. (Note: p. 100-108)

==== Mammals ====
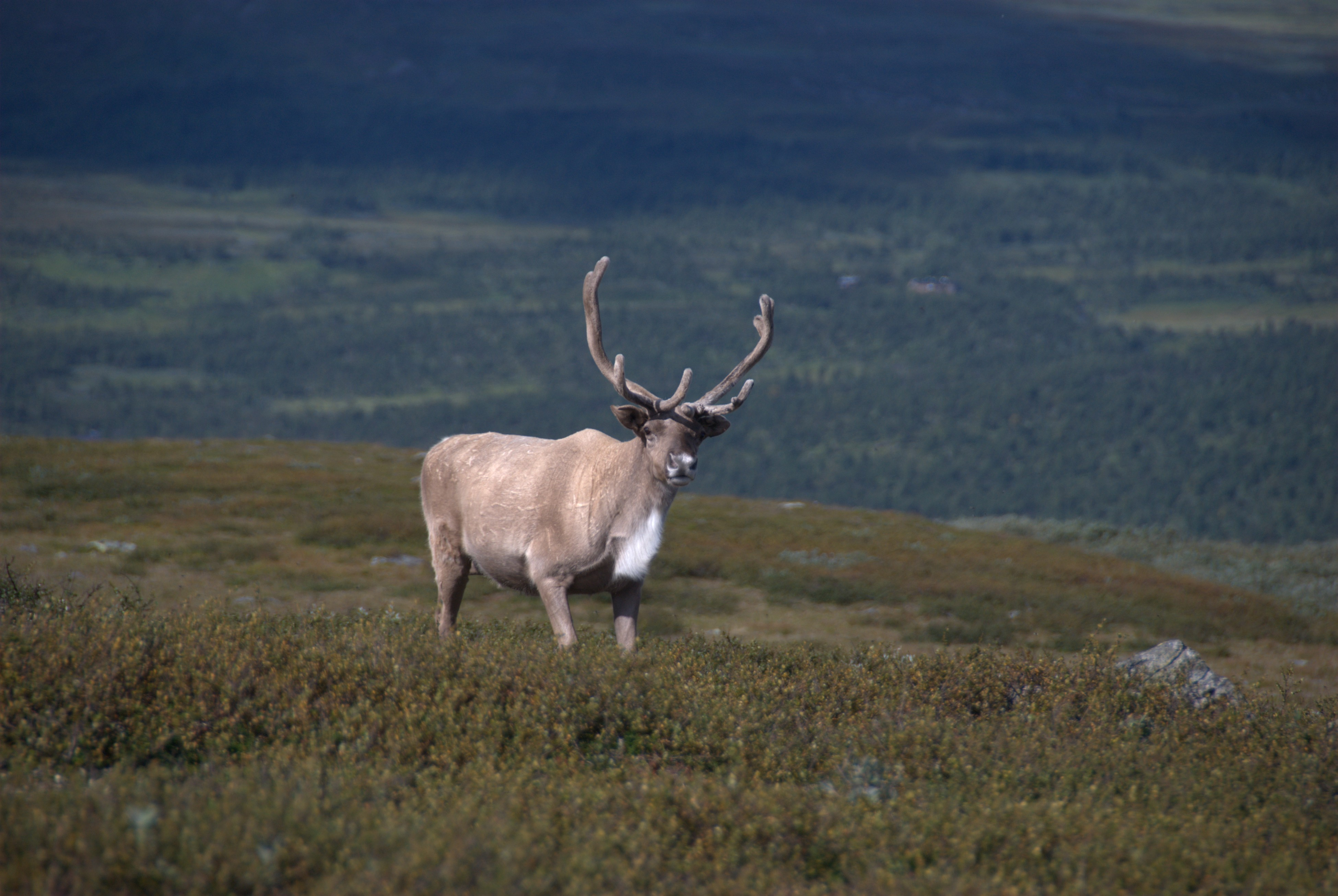
Reindeer above the Tjulträsk Valley.

Vindelfjällen home to many mammals characteristic of Swedish forests. A typical example is the moose (Alces alces), present in significant number in the coniferous and birch forests in the major valleys. Tärnaån River was one of the first sites where the Eurasian beaver (Castor fiber) was reintroduced in Sweden in 1924, after the total disappearance of the species in 1871. The major Swedish predators threatened in Sweden, are also well established in Vindelfjällen. In 2004 at least three families of Eurasian lynx (Lynx lynx, a vulnerable species in Sweden), which is significant in view of the extent of the territories of these animals. The brown bear (Ursus arctos, vulnerable species in Sweden) was once abundant in the Vindel River Valley, and although they are still present in the reserve, their numbers have decreased significantly. The Eurasian wolf (Canis lupus lupus, critically endangered in Sweden) seems to have completely disappeared from the region. Finally, the wolverine (Gulo gulo, classified as endangered in Sweden) is well established in the reserve. Although it is typically a forest animal, it is no longer present in the forests of Sweden except for near the mountains and Vindelfjällen is no exception. This is likely due to large population around Ammarfjället. Other predators include the red fox (Vulpes vulpes), which, as in most Swedish mountains, is expanding rapidly and competing with the arctic fox (Vulpes lagopus) even in the tundra.

Several species of mammals are more characteristics of alpine tundra, such as reindeer (Rangifer tarandus). As in the rest of the country, reindeer are all domesticated and belong to Sámi villages, but live in a state of semi-freedom. In total there were over 20,000 reindeer in the Vindelfjällen mountain range. Another feature of the Scandinavian tundra lemming species is the Norway lemming (Lemmus lemmus). Its fame rests notably on its periodic population explosions. Indeed, every four years on average, the number of these rodents increases dramatically and will invade large areas before quickly dying off. Favorable weather conditions and good access to food are the most likely reasons for the sharp population increases. Their mass death is less well understood, perhaps related to the decrease in vegetation caused by their excessive consumption or the spread of epidemics among the population. Regardless, this phenomenon is extremely important for the entire ecosystem of the mountain. This is particularly the case for the most symbolic animal of the Reserve; the arctic fox. These foxes breed almost exclusively in years of lemming population explosion. There are only about 200 arctic fox in the Scandinavian Mountains, and is therefore classified as critically endangered in Sweden. Vindelfjällen is one of the most important areas of all the mountains for this species, and it is actively protected. The Björkfjället mountain range is one of the best areas of Vindelfjällen for these small canines, but they are present in the Artfjället mountain range as well.

==== Birds ====
The Vindelfjällen nature reserve is a nesting site for many species of birds, due to its wide variety of habitats, but especially its many wetlands, including in particular those around Lake Tärnasjön and in the Marsivagge Valley. The Marsivagge Valley alone is considered a nesting site for about 120 different species. (Note: p. 109-117)

In these wetlands include several species of Anseriformes, such as the common scoter (Melanitta nigra), the Long-tailed Ducks (Clangula hyemalis), the common goldeneye (Bucephala clangula), the tufted duck (Aythya fuligula), the Greater Scaup (Aythya marila), mallards (Anas platyrhynchos), the Eurasian wigeon (Anas penelope), the red-breasted merganser (Mergus serrator), red-necked phalaropes (Phalaropus lobatus), and the common goosander (Mergus merganser).

The lesser white-fronted goose (Anser erythropus), an endangered species, formerly nested around Lake Tärnasjön but have not been seen there for several years; although it still regularly uses the Ammarnäs delta at its migration. There are also many species of shorebirds, such as the wood sandpiper (Tringa glareola), the common redshank (Tringa totanus), the dunlin (Calidris alpina), purple sandpiper (Calidris maritima), the common sandpiper (Actitis hypoleucos), the common snipe (Gallinago gallinago), the ruff (Philomachus pugnax) and the Whimbrel (Numenius phaeopus). On the moors near wetlands, there is also the Eurasian dotterel (Charadrius morinellus) and the European golden plover (Pluvialis apricaria). The black-throated loon (Gavia arctica) and the osprey (Pandion haliaetus) usually nest near the lakes.

The wetlands are not the only places where there are birds in the reserve. Regular inventories conducted in Tjulträsk Valley show that between 400 and 500 pairs of birds nest in one square kilometer of birch forests, half of which are the willow warbler (Phylloscopus trochilus). These forests and the alpine willow bushes are also the territory of the bluethroat (Luscinia svecica), the Lapland longspur (Calcarius lapponicus) and the willow ptarmigan (Lagopus lagopus). The moorlands, on the other hand, are the territory of the northern wheatear (Oenanthe oenanthe), the meadow pipit (Anthus pratensis) and the occasional horned lark (Eremophila alpestris). At higher altitudes, birds are sparse, but snow bunting (Plectrophenax nivalis) can be found in this region. Finally, the mountains are an important hunting ground for the golden eagle (Aquila chrysaetos), rough-legged buzzard (Buteo lagopus), the common Raven (Corvus corax), the snowy owl (Bubo scandiacus) long-tailed jaeger (Stercorarius longicaudus), the gyrfalcon (Falco rusticolus) and the peregrine falcon (Falco peregrinus).

== History ==
=== Prehistory and Sámi immigration ===
The first humans arrived in the mountains after the ice retreated at the end of the last ice age, about 9000 years ago. This may have been the ancestors of the Sámi, a nomadic people living in the Northern Scandinavia. They initially lived by hunting and gathering, the reindeer possibly being their main resource. Sharpening stones, ceramics and clubs have been found at the village of Ammarnäs, quartz shards, arrowheads were found near Tjulträsk and fragments of a stone knife were discovered near Forsavan, south the Tärnasjön. Traces of stone age dwellings can be seen near lakes Biellojaure, Överuman and Stor-Laisan. All these traces and artifacts date back to at least 4,000 to 5,000 years ago. Reindeer pitfall systems have also been discovered in the mountains, in areas where reindeer used to roam during their annual migrations. This was most often set up as holes of about two by three meters, to a depth of one or two meters, often spaced apart twenty or thirty meters from each other. They were covered with grass or leaves, and there were probably spikes at the bottom to kill the animal during its fall. Several complexes of this type of traps are present in the reserve. Traps were most often made at the limit of birch forests, however a rare higher altitude trap has been found at Vindelkroken. Some traps were still used up 700–800 years ago, after which the Sámi people changed their lifestyle and began to follow domesticated reindeer rather than trapping wild reindeer. Ten ancient Sámi graves have been discovered in the reserve. They were often placed higher up, in order to have a view of the surrounding landscape. Two tombs are located well north of Lake Tärnasjön on a small hill overlooking the bogs. South of Lake Tärnasjön, there are also graves on the islands, dating from the eighteenth and nineteenth century, probably placed there to protect them from predators.

Among the remains, there are also broader foundations than traditional Sámi dwellings, the Sámi legends associate these with a Stallo, an evil giant. Recent studies show that this is actually the oldest known Sámi settlement. In the reserve, these large foundations are often located near the traps. For example, there are some of these at Vindelkroken and several near Lake Överuman. The stallos are often described as stupid but have superhuman strength. There is a huge stone placed on some small pebbles on top near Lake Giengeljaure named stalostenen, which literally means 'stone Stallo'. Legend dictates that a Stallo would have placed a stone here to prove his strength.

The reserve has a large number of places the Sámi consider sacred, also called Sieidi. These sacred places can be spotted in Sámi place names. The words Ailes, Pass, page, Saivo, or Akka, which appear in several place names are sacred words. For example, a wooden idol, now on display at the Nordic Museum, was found in a rock hole near Lake Överst-Juktan, near a river named Ailesjokk. The hole in question was actually a place where the Sámi were accustomed to making sacrifices of wood or other animal bones. A similar site is Rosapakte, east of Lillfjället near Lake Överuman.

There are likely many graves and sacred sites that are not known, as the Sámi likely wanted to protect those sites from plundering.

Since the twentieth century, the way of life of Sámis has evolved rather quickly. One of the changes is the abandonment of several kata used in the past during the transhumance between sites of overwintered and summer pastures sites. These rudimentary abandoned buildings were gradually taken over by nature and have become difficult to notice, however some have been restored to witness the traditional Sámi life.

=== Swedish colonization ===
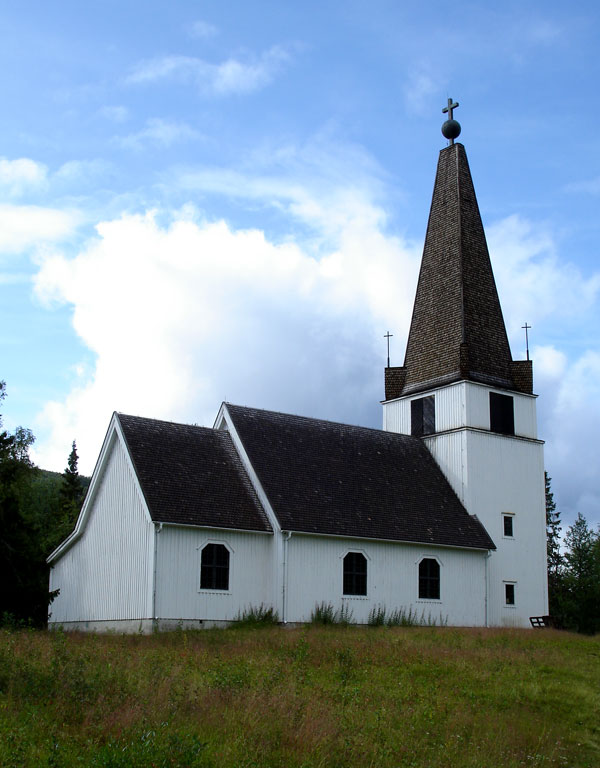
The Viktoriakyrkan church within the reserve.

Since the early eighteenth century, Swedes began to arrive in the area and settle in the valleys. There were however no villages until the nineteenth century, e.g. villages were created in the area around the lake Stor-Laisan Ammarnäs in 1830. The first house was built in 1826, and in 1850 the village was already well-formed. This colonization was encouraged by the kingdom via an exemption from taxes or other privileges. Most current villages date back to this period. Several churches were built, sometimes even before the installation of the Swedes, to serve as a place of worship for the recently evangelized Sámi. For example, the chapel of Jillesnåle, near the reserve, on the banks of Storvindeln, was originally built in 1750, and the chapel of Vila was built in 1723 near Lake Överuman but was abandoned after the change of Norwegian border in 1751 and caught fire four years later. Within the reserve, south of Lake Överst-Juktan, also lies a church, Viktoriakyrkan, built in 1938 when there was no road leading to it: wood construction was cut on site. A road was built in the mid-1970s to join the church. Several small properties are located in the vicinity of the church, with small areas of cultivated land. These areas are now abandoned or used seasonally for hunting or fishing.

Many paths now used as hiking trails were originally communication paths for mountain dwellers. For example, the priest who officiated at the Jillesnåle chapel also had to travel to Tärnaby chapel, 70 km away, and officiate there. Due to the lack of road, a path was created between the two churches. This path through the south of the reserve still exists today. Another example is a path that starts at Ammarnäs and follows the Vindel River valley then joins Vindelkroken and then crosses the Norwegian border to Mo i Rana. This path was used during the mid-nineteenth century, to buy relatively cheap groceries in Norway, during an economically difficult time for the Swedish. This journey of a hundred kilometers, with loads approaching 50 kg, was very challenging, and some of these Norgefarare, such as Josef Berglund of Ammarnäs, became local legends. From 1892 a particularly difficult year, people began to use horses to transport resources, and had to build barns and cottages along these roads, such as Vitnjul and Dalavardo. This trade continued until the First World War.

=== Protection of the area ===
The first proposal of a protection of the area occurred in 1930 when Kirjesålandet was proposed to become a national park, but did not occur. In the 1950s, hydroelectricity developments were building their reservoirs in the country (see also: energy in Sweden), but already concerns were being raised against the environmental impact of these power plants. In particular, there were heated discussions about the developments on the Ume River and Vindel River. This led in 1961 an agreement called the "peace of Sarek" (Sarek freden i) that prevented development on some rivers of the Vindelälven and in exchange gave freedom to develop the other rivers, including the Ume River. The idea also grew to protect any section of the mountainous Vindelälven watershed Under this project, the reserve, called the Reserve of Vindel-Laisfjällen (after the Vindel River and the Laisälven, its main tributary) would extend over 7,400 km^{2} of which 4,800 km^{2} in the county of Västerbotten and the remainder in the county of Norrbotten. In 1973, a working group composed of representatives of the counties and Naturvårdsverket was formed, but Norrbotten County did not join. Eventually, only the portion included in the county of Västerbotten was protected under the name Vindelfjällen on February 25, 1974 and was confirmed by the government in July 1975. The reserve protection plan was finally published in 1978. The famous hiking trail Kungsleden then stretched between Hemavan and Ammarnäs in connection with the creation of the reserve.

In the 1980s, Naturvårdsverket (the environmental protection agency of Sweden) managed a large national inventory of the primary forests, and issued a report in four years later. Some areas of primary forest had already been inventoried to be included in the Vindelfjällen reserve, so it was natural that on January 25, 1988, the reserve was extended to more than 5500 km^{2} with the addition of primary coniferous forests Kirjesålandet, Matsorliden and Giertsbäcksdalen. In 1993, the entire Vindel River was finally declared a national river (Nationalälven), permanently protecting it and all its tributaries against any hydroelectric development. Finally, the entire reserve was included in the Natura 2000 network.

In their second direction plan of the national parks, published in 2008, Naturvårdsverket proposed to change the status of the nature reserve by transforming it into a national park. The national park status is the highest level of nature protection under Swedish law. In 2007, the municipal council of the municipality of Sorsele had expressed its approval of a preliminary study on the change, but numerous residents disagreed through a petition. This caused a new vote in 2008, and this time the municipal council gave their disagreement with the preliminary study. The reason for their refusal was that many people had concerns that the stricter statute would prevent many activities, such as snowmobiling, hunting and fishing. In contrast, people favorable to the project believed that the National Park status would offer greater international recognition and thus attract more tourists. In addition, the highest protection also prevent mining in the area. In fact, the Canadian business Blackstone Nickel had asked for an exploratory permit for drilling in the reserve. The permit was granted in 2009, as the original rules of the reserve had not taken this possibly into account. Because of the problems that were created by the drilling on the Sámi reindeer herds, the company was ordered to compensate the farmers, but as of March 2013, it had still not paid.

== Management and regulation ==
In Sweden, the creation and management of nature reserves is the responsibility of municipalities and/or counties. In this case, the county of Västerbotten is responsible for the management of Vindelfjällen. The entire area of the reserve belongs to the state.

The rules establishing what is allowed and what is forbidden varies from one reserve to another and are set individually when creating each reserve. Among the rules of the Vindelfjällen reserve, it is forbidden to build infrastructure or exploit the forest. It is forbidden to visit the Marsivagge valley between May 15 and August 1 so as to not disturb the birds. It is also forbidden to drive a motor vehicle outside the areas designated for this purpose, with the exception of activities related to reindeer husbandry by Sámi. In particular, snowmobiling is allowed on the snowmobile paths, as well as several areas around Ammarnäs and Hemavan, south of Lake Tärnasjön and Kirkjesålandet and Giertsbäcksdalen. Hunting small animals (small mammals or birds, especially ptarmigans) is allowed in the reserve. Hunting is permitted only when the reindeer are not present, to avoid disturbing their breeding. Hunting season is regulated according to the population of the species, especially ptarmigan, which is continuously monitored: if the population drops to a certain level, hunting is temporarily prohibited. Hunting elk is only allowed in the mountains and only to residents of the mountain. Fishing is also permitted. Sport fishing is regulated by the granting of fishing licenses, the number is calculated based on the capacity of the river or lake. The mountain residents and the Sámi have the right to fish with nets for personal consumption, but only in large productive lakes.

Management measures are determined at the creation of the reserves and updated at regular intervals (typically several years). For the Vindelfjällen reserve, the county provides a detailed inventory of large mammals and birds; done annually for some species. Similarly, coniferous forests and birch trees as well as other "plants of interest" are inventoried regularly. (Note: p. 97-102) The county also ensures that tourism infrastructure is well maintained.

== Activities ==
=== Tourism ===
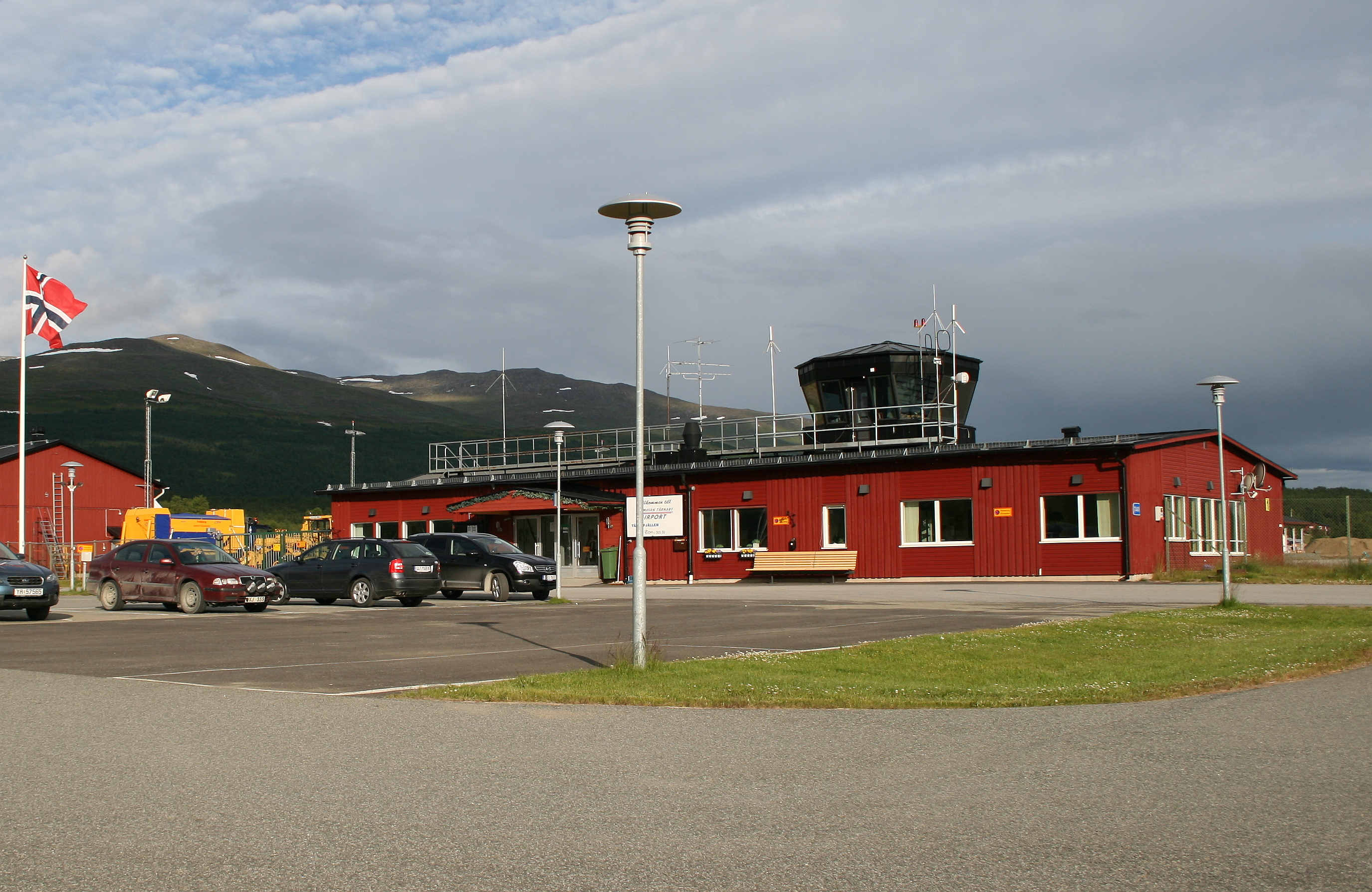
Hemavan Airport in Tärnaby, with the Norra Storfjället mountain range in the background.

The number of tourist visiting the reserve has significantly increased since the creation of the reserve. There were 412,000 tourists staying overnight in the villages of Tärnaby, Hemavan, and Ammarnäs in the year 2000. Similarly, the number of tourists staying overnight in one of the cabins along the Kungsleden hiking trail was approximately 5,000 in 2010. Tourism activities are many and varied and include hiking, horseback riding, dog sledding, cross-country skiing, snowmobiling, hunting, fishing, exploring the Sámi culture, etc. Many tourist companies are active in the reserve and the Nature Reserve designation Vindelfjällen is actively used to promote tourism, both by local and national agencies.

The main entry points for visiting the reserve are the villages of Ammarnäs or Hemavan. Both villages are easily accessible by road and are connected by bus to the main railway stations and regional cities, such as Umeå in Sweden or Mo i Rana in Norway. The Hemavan Tärnaby Airport is the closest airport to the reserve and has one flight per day, six days per week, to and from Stockholm-Arlanda, with a flight time of 2.5 hours.

At its inception, the reserve had very little tourist infrastructure, and one of the stated objectives with this creation was to improve accessibility. In 1978, Swedish architect Tore Abrahamsson presented a report to the administration of Västerbotten county in which he recommended the construction of trails and chalets. From this, many projects came to life. For example, cottages (stuga) were built along the Kungsleden trail in 1983 and in 2001, between 1993 and 1994 other cottages (koja) were within the area of the reserve that was added in 1988. In 1984, a Naturum (interpretive nature center) was built at Ammarnäs and a second one in 2004 in Hemavann.

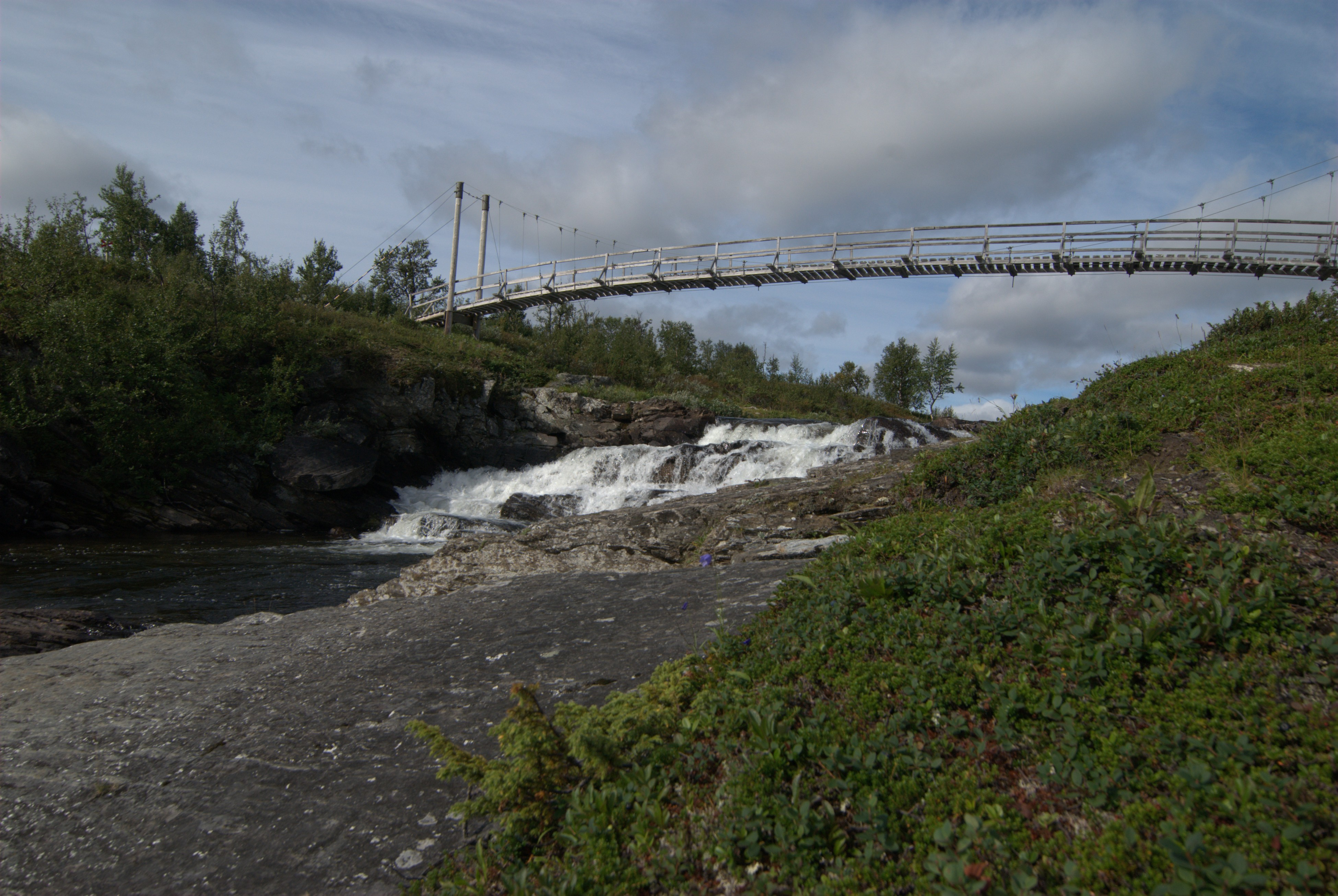
Suspension bridge over the Servvejuhka River

Nowadays, the reserve has an extensive trail system, totaling about 600 km. The best known trail is the Kungsleden trail, but Drottningleden trail (south of Hemavan) and Vindelvaggileden trail (along the Vindel River valley) are also well known. The trails are made of planks in the wetland area and numerous bridges. In all, there are more than 40 bridges in the reserve, the most notable are the successive bridges that cross Lake Tärnasjön at the southern archipelago; sometimes called the Vindelfjällen Golden Gate Vindelfjällen. Most trails are also snowmobile trails in winter, but there are also use specific paths. To enable hikers and snowmobile drivers to spend the night in the reserve, many cottages were built in the reserve. There are three types of cottages: one is a paid stuga cottage to spend the night and often contains some equipment (emergency phone, kitchen, etc.), the koja is a free cabin to spend the night, but not equipped, and finally a rudimentary rastskydd is a small cottage to take a short break. In 2012, the reserve has fifteen stuga and eight koja (for a total capacity of 250 people) as well as seven rastskydd. The main stuga (sleeping up to 30 people each) are located along the Kungsleden trail, but there are also several other trails nearby. The koja are mostly located in coniferous forests, and are usually not connected to the network of trails.

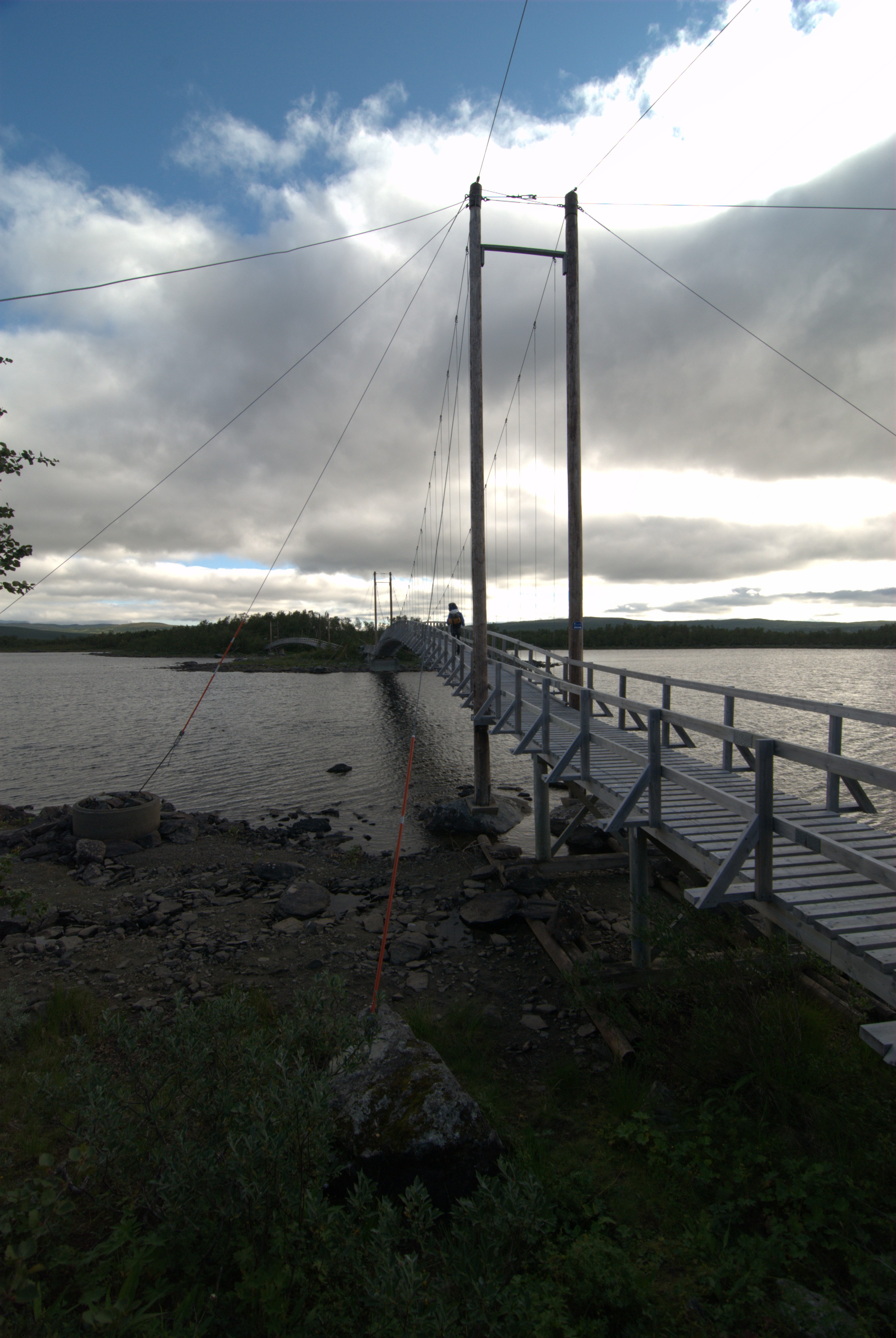
The successive bridges south of Lake Tärnasjön

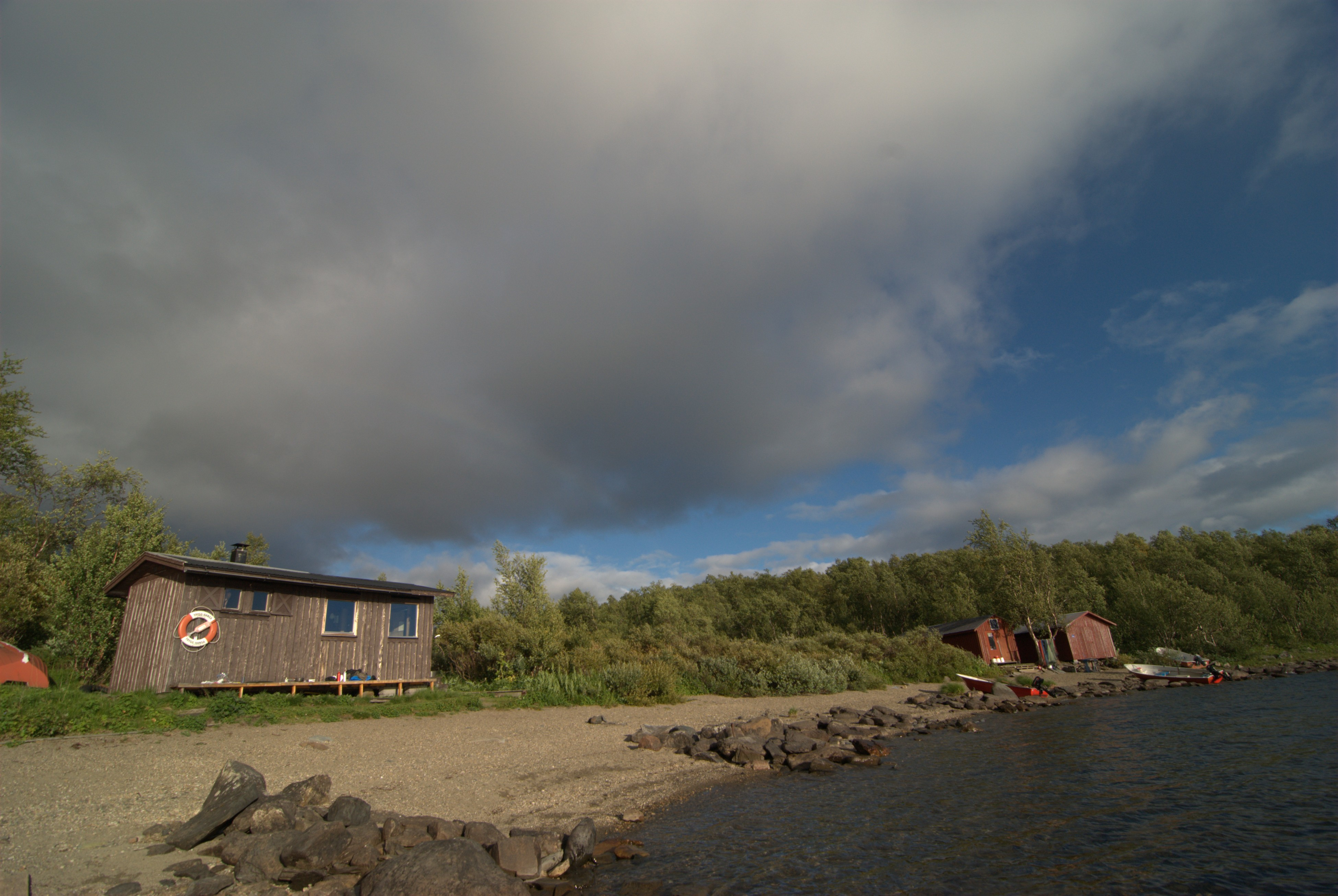
Sauna complex at Tärnasjöstugorna

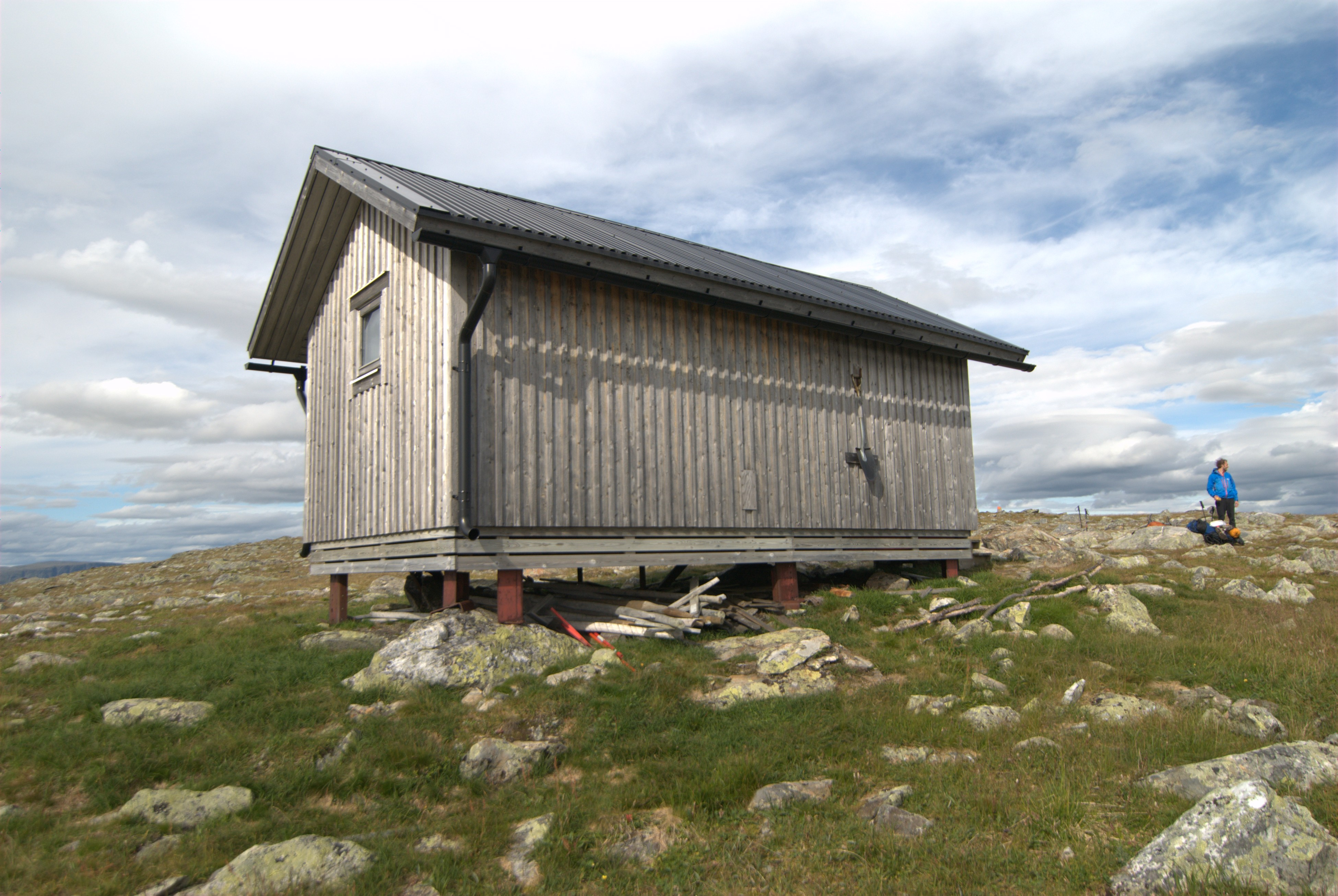
A shelter (Rastskydd) to Juovatvaratje along the Kungsleden trail

=== Other ===
Besides tourism, the main activity of the reserve is reindeer herding by Sámi, and one of the reserve 's objectives is to protect this traditional activity. The reserve is located on the western section of the three territories known as sameby (literally Sámi village) : Grans, Rans and Ubmeje tjeälddie. A sameby is a group of Sámi and the territory in which they have the right to raise their reindeer. These three sameby contain more than 20,000 reindeer. The significant tourism in the reserve sometimes conflicts with herding activities. On the other hand, livestock activities sometimes conflict with the protection of the environment, particularly the use of motorized vehicles that can cause significant damage to flora.

Hunting and fishing are also important activities in the reserve, both for local people for their own consumption as well as for leisure. The latter is partly organized by tourism enterprises.

Finally, scientific research is an activity that is growing in the reserve. This became more developed in the 1950s as a consequence of hydroelectric developments. During this time, scientists began a thorough inventory of the wealth of flora and fauna in the Valley Vindelälven. (Note: p. 117-119) In 1963, the University of Lund set up the project LUVRE (Lund University Vindel River Expedition: dispatch of the Vindel River by Lund University), that helped lead to the official protection of the river. Scientists today continue to regularly inventory flora and fauna within the framework of this project. Another important project, SEFALO, began in the reserve in the 1980s. It was led by the University of Stockholm with the purpose of ensuring the preservation of the polar fox. The research was conducted to understand the many factors the might explain why a species fails to flourish in the Scandinavian Mountains, despite protection. The project has since expanded across the Scandinavian Mountains. In 1994, a research station was built to house Ammarnäs researchers.

== Notes ==
- Abrahamsson, Tore (1989). Detta är Vindelfjällen : vandringar, dagsturer, geologi, fauna, flora. Stockholm: Bonnier. ISBN 91-34-51043-5.
- Staafjord, Tomas (2012). Vindelfjällens naturreservat: Grundutredning om natur, kultur, nyttjande och förvaltning. Umeå: Comté de Västerbotten.

== Bibliography ==
- Grundsten, Claes (1998). På fjälltur : Vindelfjällen : turbeskrivningar. Stockholm: Rabén Prisma. ISBN 91-518-3346-8.
- Abrahamsson, Tore (1989). Detta är Vindelfjällen : [vandringar, dagsturer, geologi, fauna, flora]. Stockholm: Bonnier. ISBN 91-34-51043-5.
- Nyström, Hans (2012). Där Vindelfjällen tar vid. Carlssons. ISBN 978-91-7331-460-2.
