= Adolfström =

Adolfsström
- Village
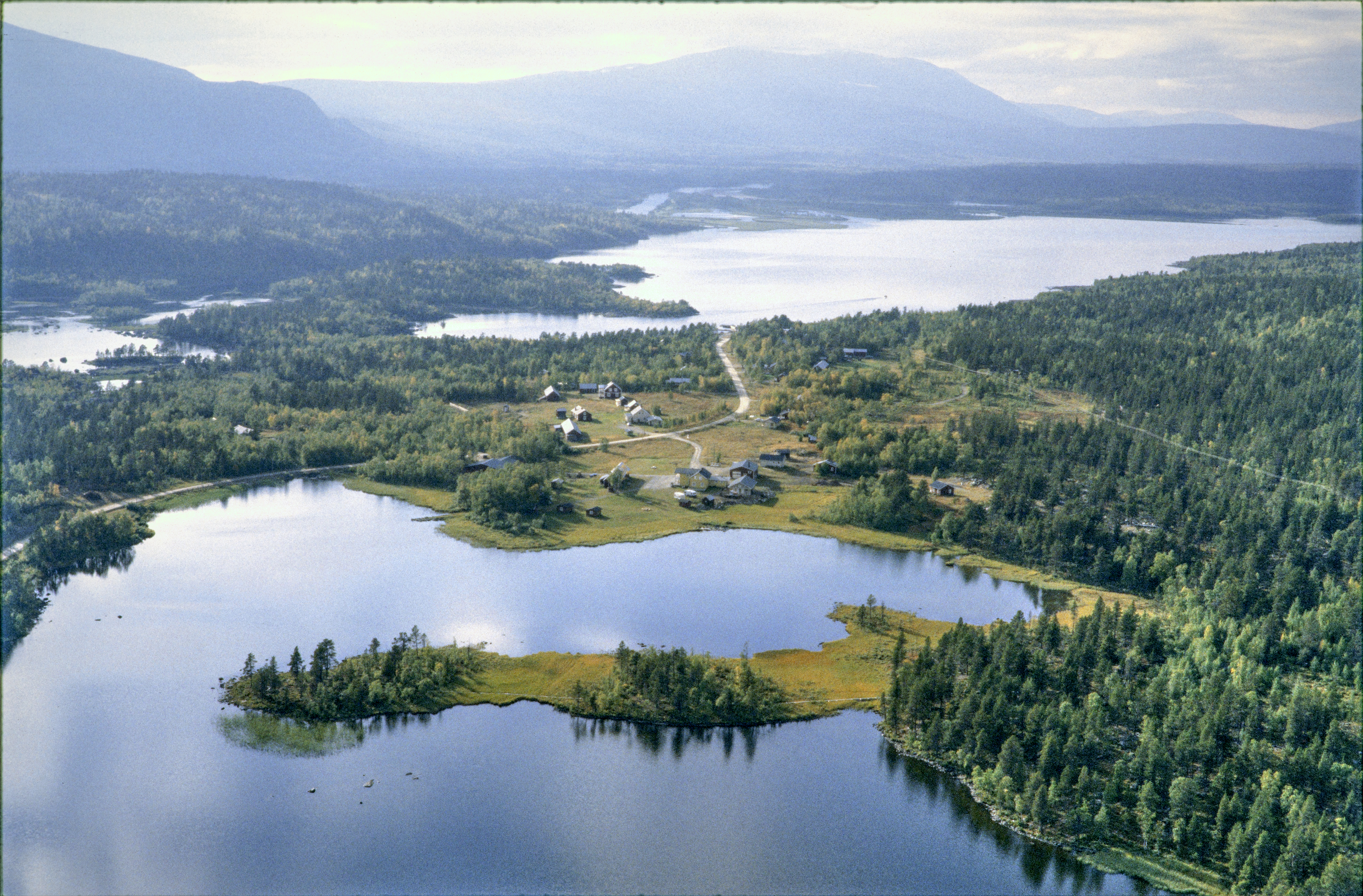
- Interactive map of Adolfsström
- Coordinates: 66.2775°N 16.661111°E
- Country: Sweden
- Region: Lappland
- County: Norrbotten County
- Municipality: Arjeplog Municipality
- District: Arjeplogs distrikt
- Established: 1774

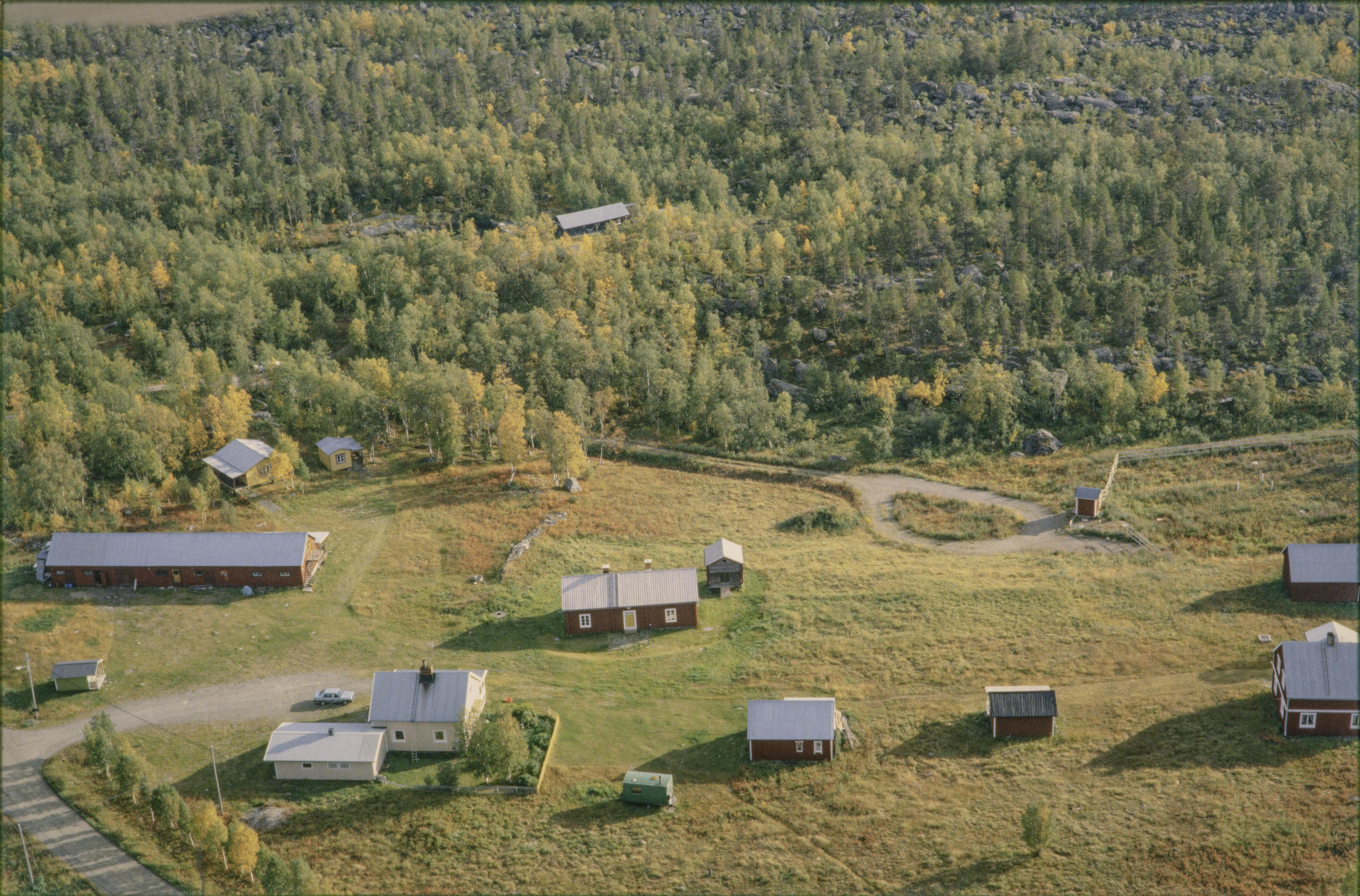
Adolfsström in September 1995

Adolfsström (also called Adolfström) is a village in the western part of Arjeplog municipality, on the Laisälven river and Lake Iraft (or Yraf). The King's Trail (Kungsleden) passes Adolfsström on its way between Ammarnäs and Jäkkvik, and the highway from Laisvall ends here.

== History ==
Adolfsström was founded as a mining community. In 1774, a smelter was built here to melt silver from the Nasa silver mine, but in 1810 it was abandoned after the mining operations ceased. A fire in 1821, suspected to be arson, destroyed most of the site's buildings. One building still stands today, the so-called Majorsgården. Adolfsström was abandoned for a couple of decades before the first settler Jonas Lundmark and his family arrived in 1840.

The village received a telephone line in 1922, electricity in 1947 and a motorway in 1960.

Today, Adolfsström is mainly a tourist place.
