= Laisälven =

River in Sweden

Coordinates: 65°37′31″N 17°28′20″E

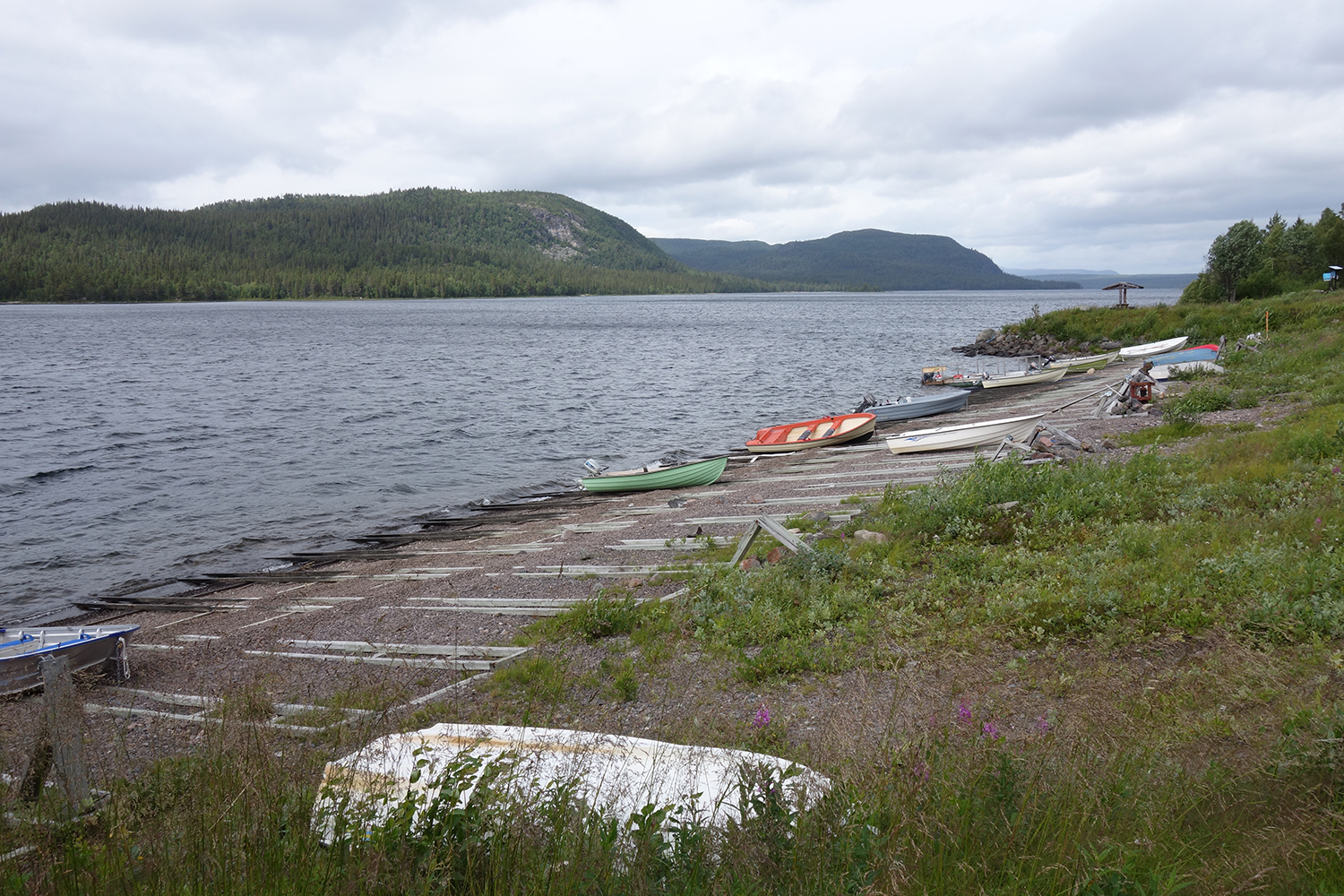
Lake Laisan

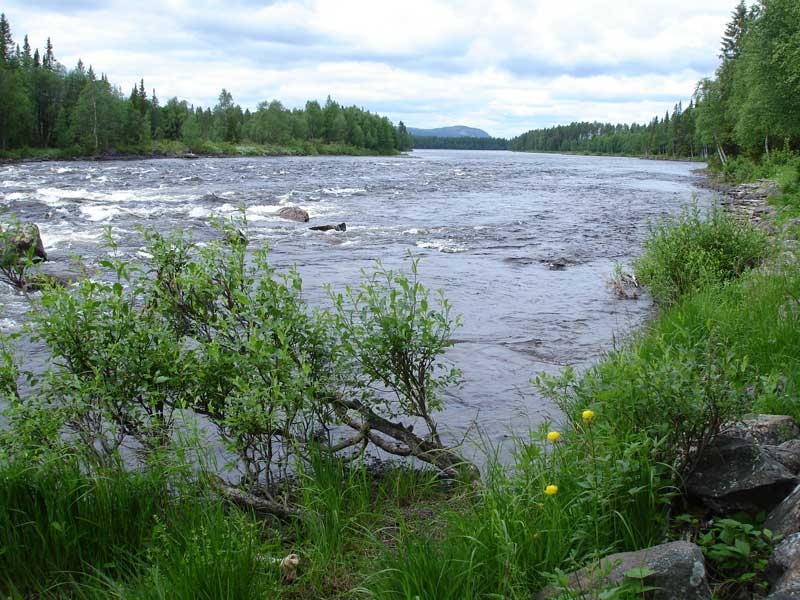
Forsar in the river Laisälven, about five kilometers upstream from the outlet to the river Vindelälven.

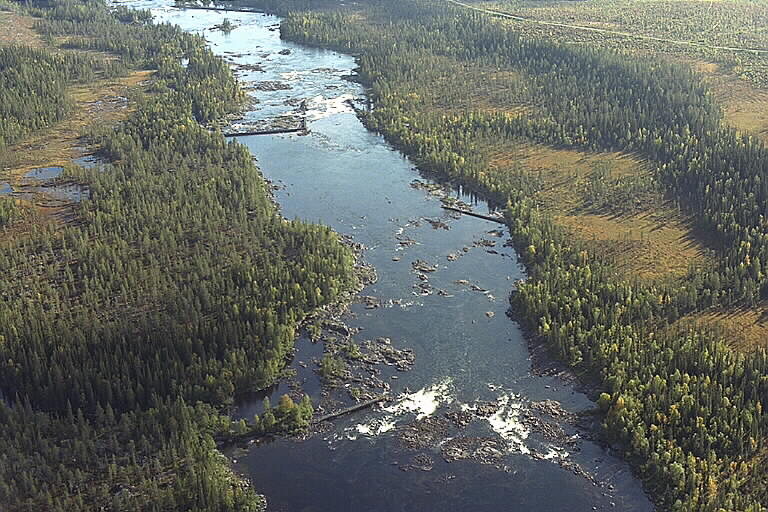
Aerial view of Laisälven upstream of Nedre Gautsträsket.

Laisälven (Ume Sami: Lájssuo) is a river in central Lapland, in the municipalities of Arjeplog and Sorsele, Sweden with a length of 190 km. The catchment area is about 3 000 km^{2}. The Laisälven is the largest tributary of the Vindelälven.

The Laisälven river is of national interest for cultural environment conservation.

== Geography ==
The Laisälven river has its source at an altitude of 850 metres near Nasafjället on the border with Norway, flowing with streams and seals through mountainous landscapes down to the lakes Iraft at Adolfström, Mittisjön and Gautosjön at Gautosjö. The river then flows into the nearly three mile long lake Laisan, where the communities of Laisvall and Laisvallby are located. The tributary Krámájuhka flows into Kramaviken at Västra Laisvall, draining Lake Kramasjön and surrounding lakes southeast of the mountain Kráhpiesvárrie. Downstream of Laisan is the river's largest tributary, Dellikälven. This tributary has several lakes in its upper reaches that are adjacent to the royal trail, including Áhájávrrie and Njallapliehkie, and further downstream it receives Máddávriejuhka from Jilliehávrie and Máddávrrie and Kráptajuhka from Kráptajávrrie. Downstream of the mouth of the Dellikälven, the Laisälven passes through largely uninhabited areas before entering the Vindelälven in the upper part of the lake Nedre Gautsträsket about 10 km north of Sorsele. The average water flow at the mouth is 57 m³/s.

== Use ==
In Iraft, Mittisjön and Gautosjön there are char and trout. In Laisan, which is very deep, in addition to these species there are also grayling, whitefish, perch, pike and burbot. Laisan is popular for trolling. Krámájuhka, which flows into Laisan, holds mainly grayling and trout. At Luspeströmmen, Laisan turns into streams, including Ackerselet, Ackerforsen, Svanselet, Djupselet, Hästskoforsen, Dellikselet and Brattforsen. There are several popular spots for sport fishing.
