= Sädvvájávrre =

Lake in Arjeplog Municipality, Sweden

- Lake
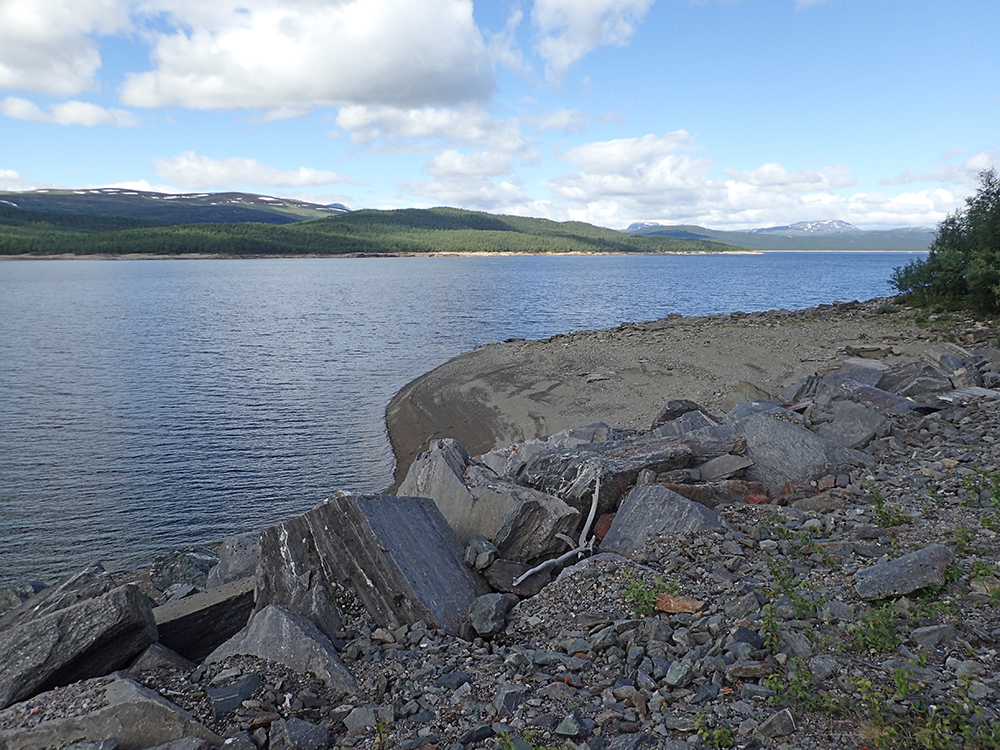
- Sädvvájávrre with strongly eroded shores due to water level regulation.
- Interactive map of Sädvvájávrre
- Location: Sweden
- Coordinates: 66°28′16.97″N 16°31′22.44″E
- Surface area: 40.1 km^{2} (15.5 sq mi)
- Max. depth: 120 m (390 ft)
- Water volume: 762,000,000 m^{3} (2.69×10^{10} cu ft)
- Surface elevation: 466.6 m (1,531 ft)

Sädvvájávrre, or Sädvajaure, is a lake in Arjeplog Municipality in the province of Lapland, which is part of the main catchment area of the Skellefte River. The lake is 120 meters deep, covers an area of 40.1 square kilometers and has an elevation of 466.6 meters above sea level. Sädvvájávrre is located in the upper part of the Skellefte River and is drained by the same river. During test fishing, lake trout, arctic char, splejk (hybrid), burbot and brown trout have been caught in the lake.

The Silver Route follows the northern shore of Sädvvájávre and the Pieljekaise National Park is on the southern side and extends into the lake.

== Hydropower reservoir ==
Sädvvájávrre is used as a water reservoir for long-term regulation of hydroelectric power production in the almost completely developed Skellefteälven. The lake has been regulated several times in 1942, 1953 and 1985. The water level varies between 460.7 and 477 meters above sea level. The volume of the reservoir is 605 million cubic meters.

== Nasafjäll Mine ==
=== Forest impacts ===
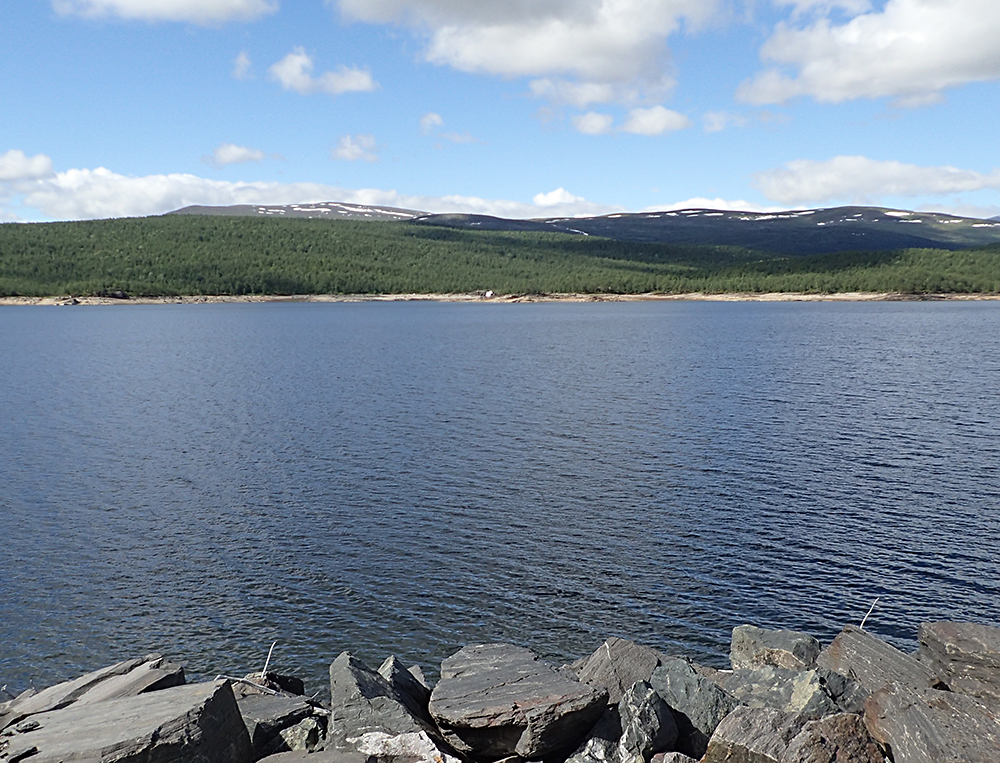

On the south side of Sädvvájávrre, near the outlet of the Silbbajåhkå watercourse, there was a foundry belonging to the Nasa silver mine between 1635 and 1659. Silbbajåhkå has rapids suitable for driving the smelter's bellows. Around Sädvvájávrre at this time, there were extensive pine forests from which wood and charcoal were taken for the smelter. In total, at least 4,000-5,000 hectares were clear-cut. Pine stumps from these logging operations are still present around the lake, and coal beds have been found in several places. The pine forest has still not recovered. In the western part of the lake, west of the smelter, there are now only a few pine trees. Towards the east, the presence of pine increases, and sometimes there are even small stands, but almost all the trees have grown after the end of the Nasafjäll era.

=== Silbojokk Parish ===
When the smelter was built, Silbojokk Parish, was also established for the people of the smelter. Little is known about the first church building, but the parish was formally established in 1640 and received its first vicar, Johannes Byrelius, in the same year. In 1659 both the ironworks and the church were burned down by a Norwegian force.

The cabin was not rebuilt, but the congregation continued to serve the needs of the mountain Sami. During the summer, when the Sami were in the area, services were held in a hall in one of the remaining houses. However, the room was very cramped for the congregation, which numbered about 80 people. Consequently, a new church was built in 1691 next to the cemetery. After it burned down in 1747, a temporary place of worship was set up, and the Sami continued to hold summer services in Silbojokk. In the 1760s, discussions began about constructing a new church. Since there was no longer any usable timber forest around Sädvvájávrre, a new chapel was built in 1777 in Lövmokk, just north of Jäkkvik. Thereafter, Silbojokk ceased to exist as a parish.

== Archaeological research ==
Before the last raising of the Sädvvájávrre dam limit, archaeological investigations were carried out in 1983 and 1984. The smelter, which was located south of Silbbajåhkå, was excavated together with residential and outbuildings. North of the stream, the remains of a smithy were examined. On the so-called Kyrkudden, the remains of a building were found that was uncertainly interpreted as a church. However, there were no traces of burials in the vicinity.

Following the raising of the dam limit in 1985, the hut area was subjected to heavy water and ice impact every year. After large amounts of soil were washed away, two locals found a skull in 2002, leading to a rescue survey in 2004. Archaeologists discovered that it was the old cemetery that had been uncovered. Additionally, a house foundation thought to be the remains of one of the two church buildings in Silbojokk was found. Eleven graves with a total of 15 individuals were discovered inside and around the foundation. Further excavations in 2005 revealed another twelve graves and the remains of at least 13 individuals. Remains of what was assumed to be the second church building were also found.

Another survey was conducted in 2015, during which the extent of the cemetery could be better delineated, and almost 250 loose finds were discovered in the swelling ground, mostly nails but also human bones, window glass, and lead. Three graves were examined, confirming that the remains of both church buildings planned for Silbojokk had been located.

== Sub-catchment area ==
Sädvvájávrre is part of the sub-basin (737429–153274) that SMHI calls the Sädvajaure outlet. The average altitude is 552 meters above sea level and the area is 130.65 square kilometers. If the 86 upstream catchment areas are included, the cumulative area is 1 467.19 square kilometers. The river Skellefteälven flows into the sea and the catchment area consists mostly of forest (63%). The catchment area has 40.38 square kilometers of water surface, giving it a lake percentage of 30.9 percent.
