= Vuoggatjålme =

Coordinates: 66°34′N 16°21′E

- Interactive map of Vuoggatjålme
- Country: Sweden
- County: Norrbotten County
- Municipality: Arjeplog Municipality
- Elevation: 500 m (1,600 ft)
- Time zone: UTC+1 (CET)
  - Summer (DST): UTC+2 (CEST)

Vuoggatjålme is a locality in the mountainous part of Arjeplog Municipality, Sweden, located slightly off Swedish national road 95 ("The Silver Road"). It is primarily a tourist facility. Vuoggatjålme is located on the shore of the lake Vuoggatjålmjaure, just above the northern tip of lake Sädvvájávrre.

South along National road 95 is Jäkkvik, Hornavan and Arjeplog. To the north the road goes past Mierkenis to the border with Norway.

== Climate ==
The lowest temperature measured at an official Swedish weather station is -52.6 °C in Vuoggatjålme on February 2, 1966. There is some uncertainty around the accuracy of this figure, as there is a substantial discrepancy between the other temperature recordings taken at the time but it is still the official record. On February 4, 1966, the station recorded -52.1 °C.

Climate data for Vuoggatjålme 1991-2020 normals (500m)
Month	Jan	Feb	Mar	Apr	May	Jun	Jul	Aug	Sep	Oct	Nov	Dec	Year
Mean daily maximum °C (°F)	−7.3 (18.9)	−6.6 (20.1)	−2.2 (28.0)	2.9 (37.2)	8.4 (47.1)	14.0 (57.2)	17.5 (63.5)	15.6 (60.1)	10.4 (50.7)	3.4 (38.1)	−2.4 (27.7)	−5.3 (22.5)	4.0 (39.3)
Daily mean °C (°F)	−11.3 (11.7)	−10.9 (12.4)	−7.0 (19.4)	−1.5 (29.3)	4.1 (39.4)	9.3 (48.7)	12.7 (54.9)	11.2 (52.2)	6.6 (43.9)	0.5 (32.9)	−5.8 (21.6)	−8.8 (16.2)	−0.1 (31.9)
Mean daily minimum °C (°F)	−17.3 (0.9)	−16.9 (1.6)	−12.8 (9.0)	−6.5 (20.3)	−0.4 (31.3)	4.7 (40.5)	8.2 (46.8)	6.8 (44.2)	3.0 (37.4)	−2.6 (27.3)	−9.6 (14.7)	−14.2 (6.4)	−4.8 (23.4)
Average precipitation mm (inches)	54.8 (2.16)	43.4 (1.71)	43.8 (1.72)	27.8 (1.09)	34.0 (1.34)	54.8 (2.16)	78.5 (3.09)	69.4 (2.73)	57.2 (2.25)	45.7 (1.80)	46.7 (1.84)	54.5 (2.15)	610.6 (24.04)
Source: NOAA

Climate data for Mierkenis A 1991-2020 normals (614m)
Month	Jan	Feb	Mar	Apr	May	Jun	Jul	Aug	Sep	Oct	Nov	Dec	Year
Mean daily maximum °C (°F)	−6.5 (20.3)	−6.4 (20.5)	−3.3 (26.1)	1.3 (34.3)	6.5 (43.7)	12.7 (54.9)	16.3 (61.3)	14.4 (57.9)	9.1 (48.4)	2.2 (36.0)	−2.7 (27.1)	−4.8 (23.4)	3.2 (37.8)
Daily mean °C (°F)	−11.0 (12.2)	−11.0 (12.2)	−7.8 (18.0)	−2.8 (27.0)	2.7 (36.9)	8.1 (46.6)	11.5 (52.7)	9.9 (49.8)	5.3 (41.5)	−0.9 (30.4)	−6.4 (20.5)	−8.9 (16.0)	−0.9 (30.3)
Mean daily minimum °C (°F)	−15.3 (4.5)	−15.7 (3.7)	−12.8 (9.0)	−7.4 (18.7)	−1.6 (29.1)	3.3 (37.9)	6.8 (44.2)	5.7 (42.3)	1.9 (35.4)	−3.8 (25.2)	−10.0 (14.0)	−13.0 (8.6)	−5.2 (22.7)
Average precipitation mm (inches)	72.3 (2.85)	58.0 (2.28)	63.1 (2.48)	37.3 (1.47)	39.8 (1.57)	55.6 (2.19)	83.3 (3.28)	70.6 (2.78)	70.2 (2.76)	62.6 (2.46)	62.3 (2.45)	71.2 (2.80)	746.3 (29.37)
Source: NOAA
