= Laisvall =

Laisvall Lájsogiedde (Northern Sami)
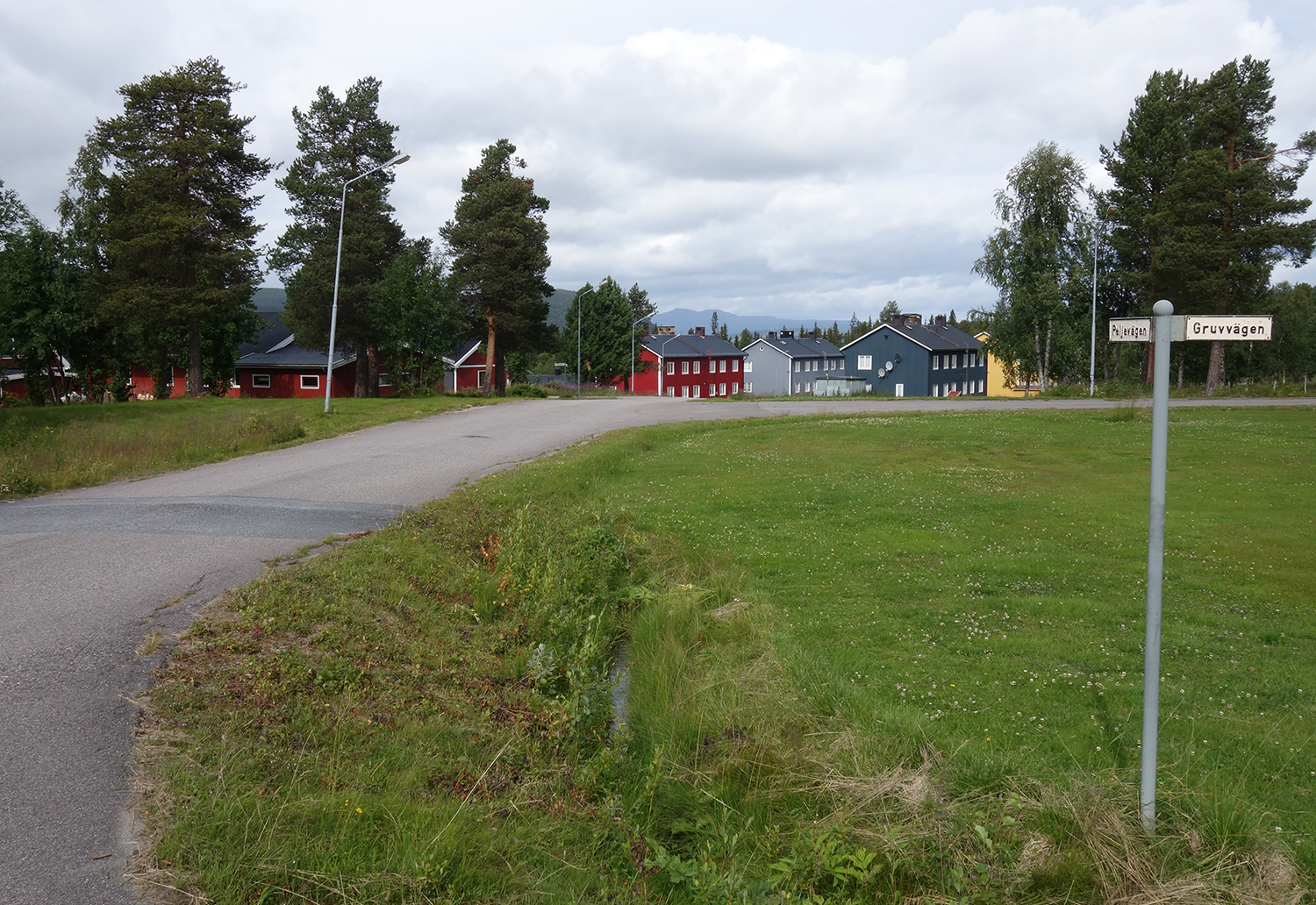
- Central Laisvall
- Interactive map of Laisvall
- Location within Norrbotten Location within Sweden
- Country: Sweden
- Province: Norrbotten
- County: Norrbotten County
- Municipality: Arjeplog Municipality

Area
  - Total: 0.49 km^{2} (0.19 sq mi)

Population (31 December 2010)
  - Total: 105
  - Density: 214/km^{2} (550/sq mi)
- Time zone: UTC+1 (CET)
  - Summer (DST): UTC+2 (CEST)

Laisvall (Northern Sami: Lájsogiedde) is a former mining community situated in Arjeplog Municipality, Norrbotten County, Sweden, with 105 inhabitants in 2010.

== History ==
The area around Laisvall was traditionally used by Sami for reindeer herding. Up until 1941 consisted the site of undeveloped forest land and was known as Skorro. Swedish Land Survey changed the name from Skorro to Laisvall in 1941 and began developing around Laisvall lead mine, which was in operation from 1943 to 2001 and was operated by Boliden AB.

== Geography ==
Laisvall is situated on the shore of Laisan, a long narrow lake formed along the course of Laisälven river. The settlement is located about 30 km west of Arjeplog.
