= Junkerdalen =

Valley in Nordland, Norway

Junkerdalen (Norwegian); Juŋŋkárvuobme (Lule Sami)
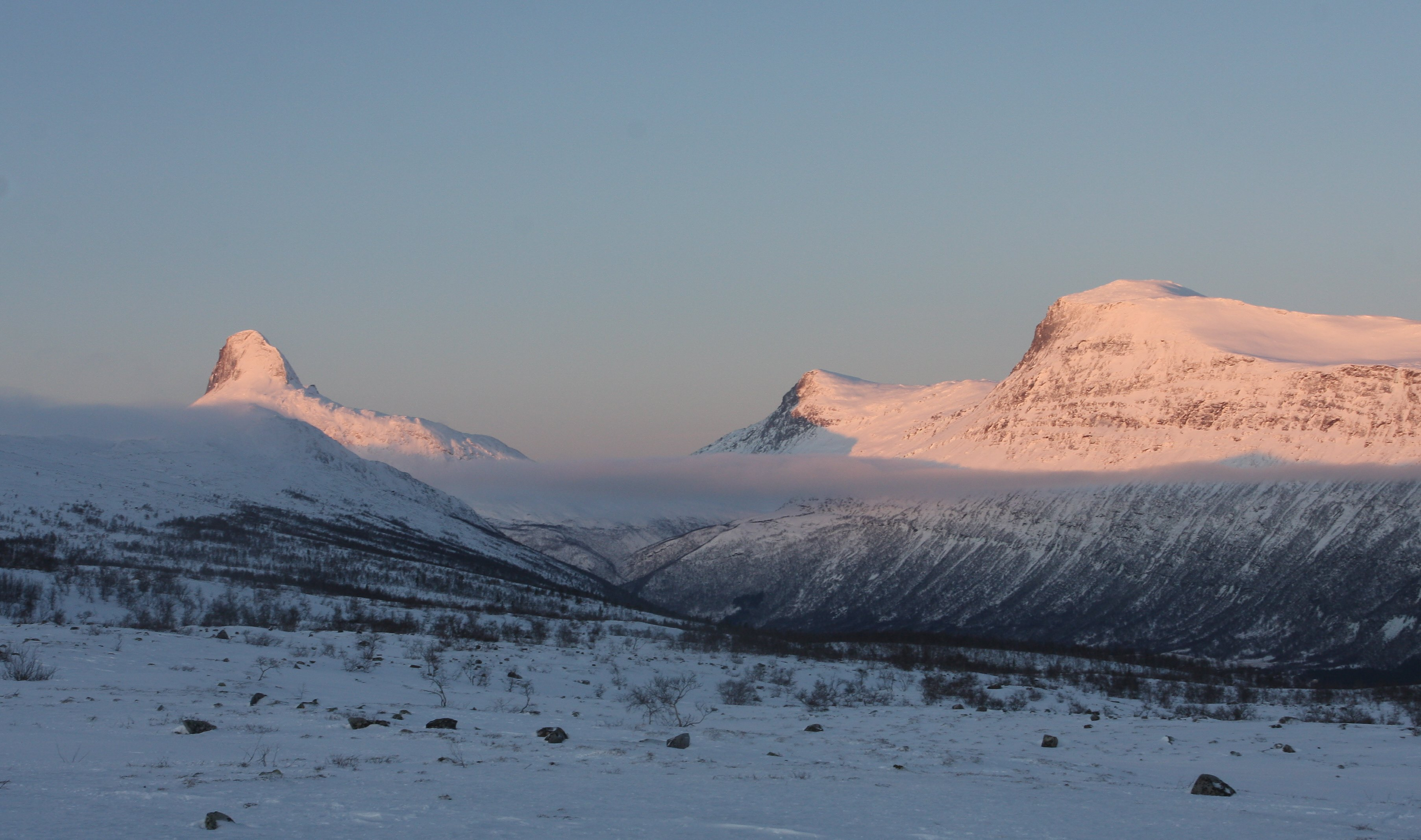
- View of Junkerdalen to the north after it snowed in September. Solvågtinden is the mountain on the left. Credit: Jim T. Kristensen

Geology
- Type: River valley

Geography
- Location: Nordland, Norway
- Coordinates: 66.78778°N 15.58194°E

Location
- Interactive map of the valley

Junkerdalen (Norwegian; lit. 'Junker valley') or Juŋŋkárvuobme (Lule Sami) is a valley in Saltdal Municipality in Nordland county. It is a side valley to the main Saltdalen valley. The Junkerdalen valley begins at the village of Storjord from where it stretches in a south-easterly direction towards Graddis and the national border with Sweden. The beginning of Junkerdalen is a narrow gorge called Junkerdalsura, where Junkerdalselva flows into waterfalls and rapids before it joins with Lønselva and after this, it is called Saltdalselva. The side valleys Tjårrisdalen and Skaitidalen go out from Junkerdalen in a northerly direction. Up in the valley, Graddiselva and Skaitielva flow together, and from here the river is called Junkerdalselva. Between Tjårrisdalen and Junkerdalsura lies the village of Junkerdal.

The entire valley is around 22 kilometres (14 mi) long from Storjord to the border with Sweden. From the end of Junkerdalsura and further up the valley, the height is around 200 metres (660 ft) above sea level and the valley has a slight rise here, but approximately where the side valley Skaiti begins, the valley becomes steep. At the national border, the height is around 600 metres (2,000 ft). The valley is surrounded by large mountains; the most prominent are Solvågtinden and Båtfjellet. There are settlements like Junkerdal throughout the valley. Norwegian County Road 77 towards Sweden also runs through the entire valley. Junkerdalsura nature reserve and Stor-Graddis nature reserve have been established in the area. The valley otherwise has a lot of pine forest, but also birch and mixed forest. Previously, there was a mountain lodge at Graddis.

== Geology ==
Amund Helland writes in the chapter on Saltdalen in Norges land og folk (1908) that there is slate in Junkerdalen, and that the valley was formed during the last ice age. Helland says that the mountains around Junkerdalen have been peculiar in the past, and then mentions Solvågtinden, Båtfjellet and Tausa. Tjernfjellet on the south side is made of granite and is less strange.

The valley floor in Junkerdalen consists of sand and gravel, and stones of different sizes. The valley floor is covered by thin and lean soil. Junkerdalsura is narrow, and therefore it happens that the valley floor is submerged in the spring flood.

== Geography ==
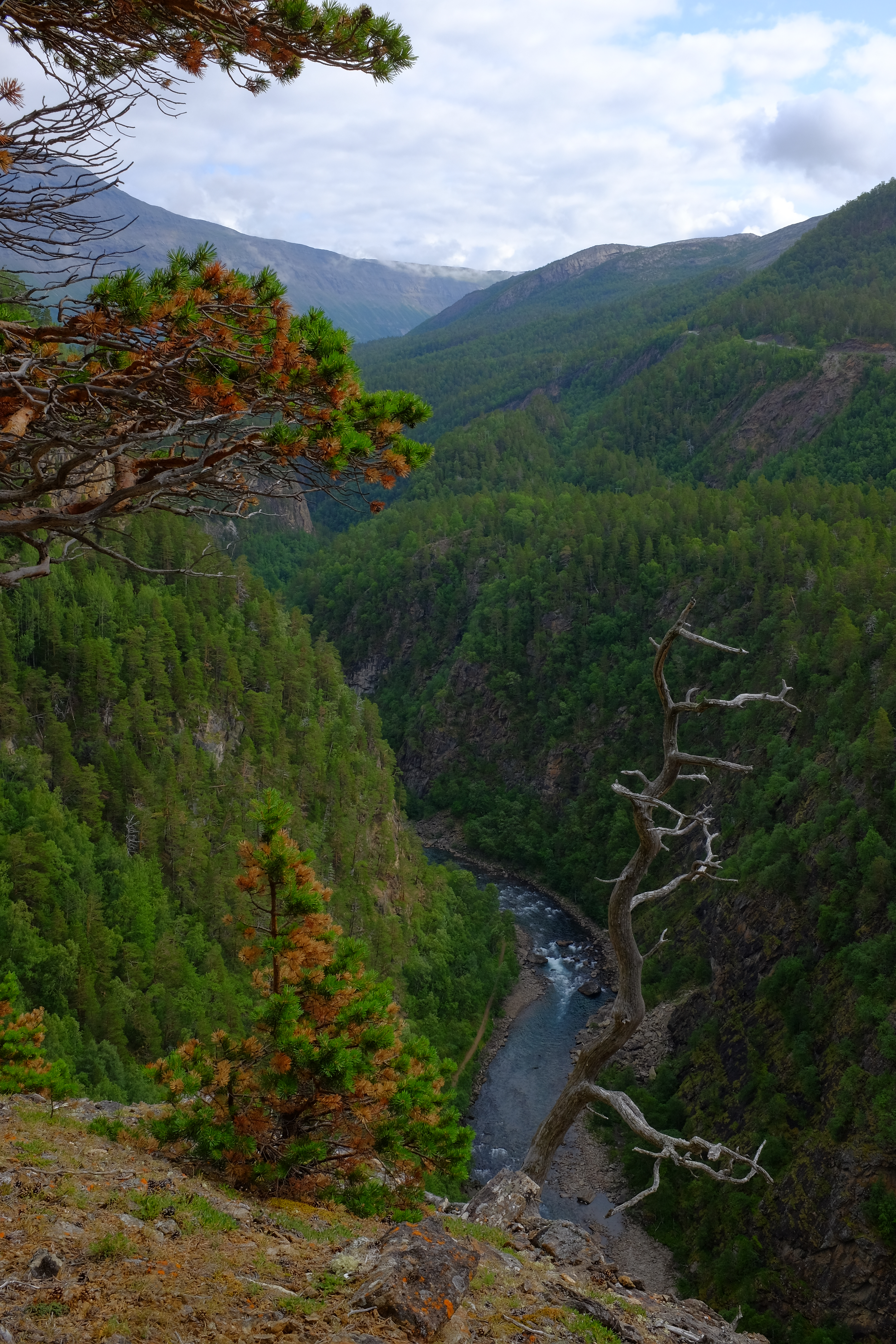
From Junkerdalsura where the Junkerdalselva flows in small rapids and waterfalls. Credit: Frankemann (4 August 2019)

=== Junkerdalsura ===
In earlier times, the road to Junkerdalen was only a path across from Evenesdalen over Solvågskaret. This very narrow gorge has large sections of stone clocks on both sides. The road up Junkerdalsura was built along the river and in places it is high above it. The surrounding mountain walls are steep and there are often has both snow and rock avalanches. The road is so narrow that there is no room for paving stones, and besides, paving stones will be torn down by landslides anyway. The slopes that descend into Junkerdalsura in winter and spring start at the very top at Solvågtinden.

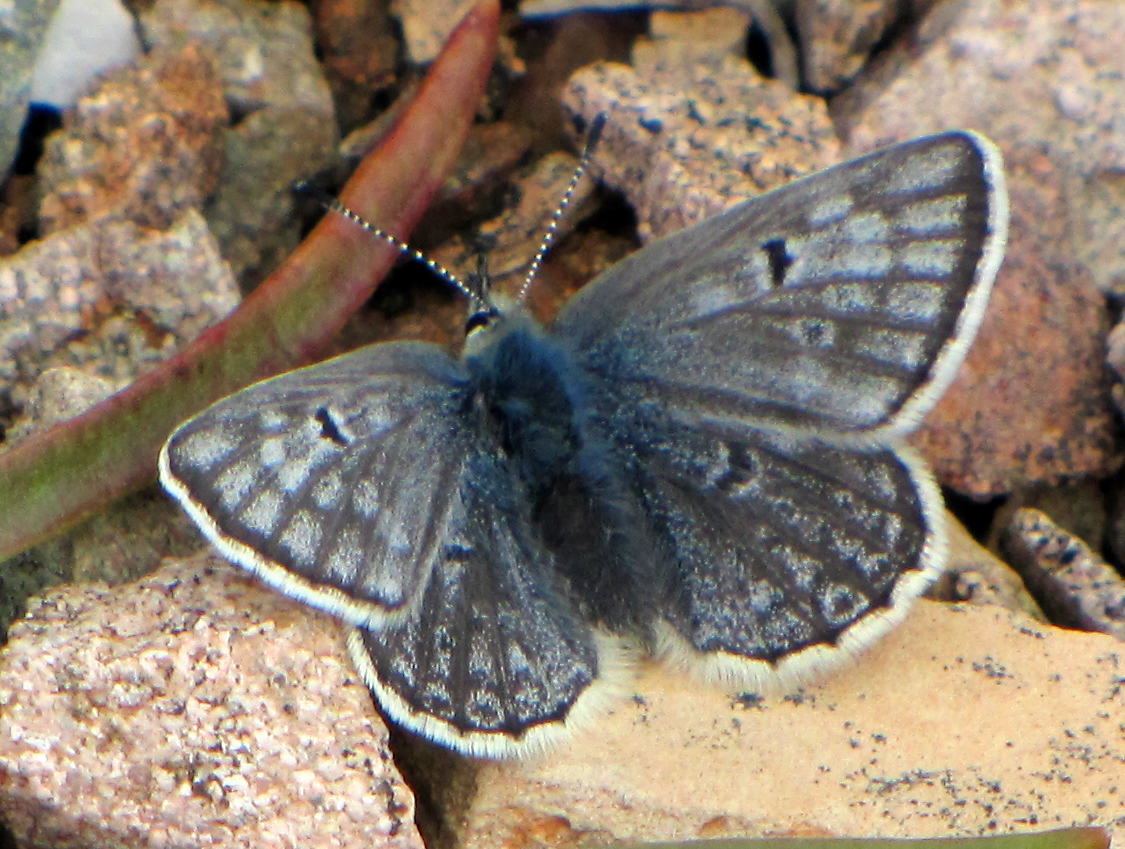
The rare Arctic blue butterfly has been registered in Junkerdalen. Credit: D. Gordon E. Robertson (30 June 2010)

=== Hoveddalen ===
Junkerdalselva is formed up in Junkerdalen by the confluence of Graddiselva and Skaitielva at Lappbrulia. The Graddiselva has its sources in Sweden and flows in waterfalls down the craggy mountain areas of Graddis. The Junkerdalselva flows calmly through the Junkerdalen itself.

Tjørrisdalen and Skaitidalen are narrow gorges where they enter Junkerdalen. Since ancient times, there has been a road through Junkerdalen via Graddis and across to Sweden. The height of the pass is on the Swedish side and is 686 metres (2,251 ft) above sea level.

== Flora and fauna ==
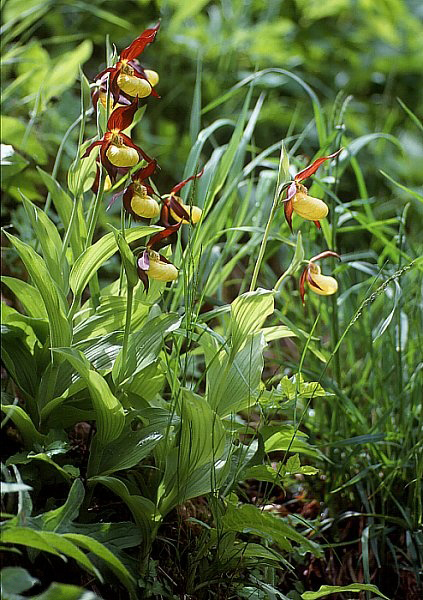
Cypripedium calceolus is one of the plants found in Junkerdalen. Credit: Mg-k (27 June 2010)

The priest Søren Christian Sommerfelt worked in Saltdal from 1818 to 1824. Here, he laid the foundations for his important botanical work, Supplementum Florae lapponicae from 1826. The work is intended as an addition to the Swede Göran Wahlenberg's Flora lapponica from 1812. Sommerfelt's work on plants is still an important source work. Sommerfelt did part of his investigations in Junkerdalsura. The work provides an overview of 700 northern Norwegian plant species.

Junkerdalen lies in the rain shadow compared to Svartisen, and has a relatively warm and dry summer climate. The climate and favorable bedrock have given life to many plant species. The plant life in the eastern parts was already protected in 1928 as the Junkerdalen-Balvatnet plant conservation area. Junkerdal National Park was adopted in 2004 and includes areas in Junkerdalen and Balvatnet in Fauske municipality. In the national park there are a number of mountain areas with plants of great botanical richness. Several of the vegetation types are generally rare, such as border heather and reindeer heather with lapis lazuli. Many of the plants in the national park are otherwise only found further north, or on other continents. Some of the special plants are Grønlandsstarr, Silver saxifraga, Arctic poppy, halvkulerublom, svartbakkestjerne and fjellsolblom. Other rare plants in the national park are Høgfjellsclokk, Pedicularis flammea, and Pedicularis hirsuta.

The rich bedrock in Junkerdalen provides the basis for rich vegetation, which in turn provides the basis for a rich and varied animal life. Many rare and endangered birds nest in the area, including peregrine falcons, golden eagles, grebes, ducks and sea bream. Wolverine and lynx are permanent residents of the Junkerdal area, and arctic foxes, bears and otters roam through the area. Reindeer grazing takes place all year round.

Other protected areas in connection with the valley are Stor-Graddis and Junkerdalsura nature reserve.

== History ==
=== Preben von Ahnen and the naming tradition ===
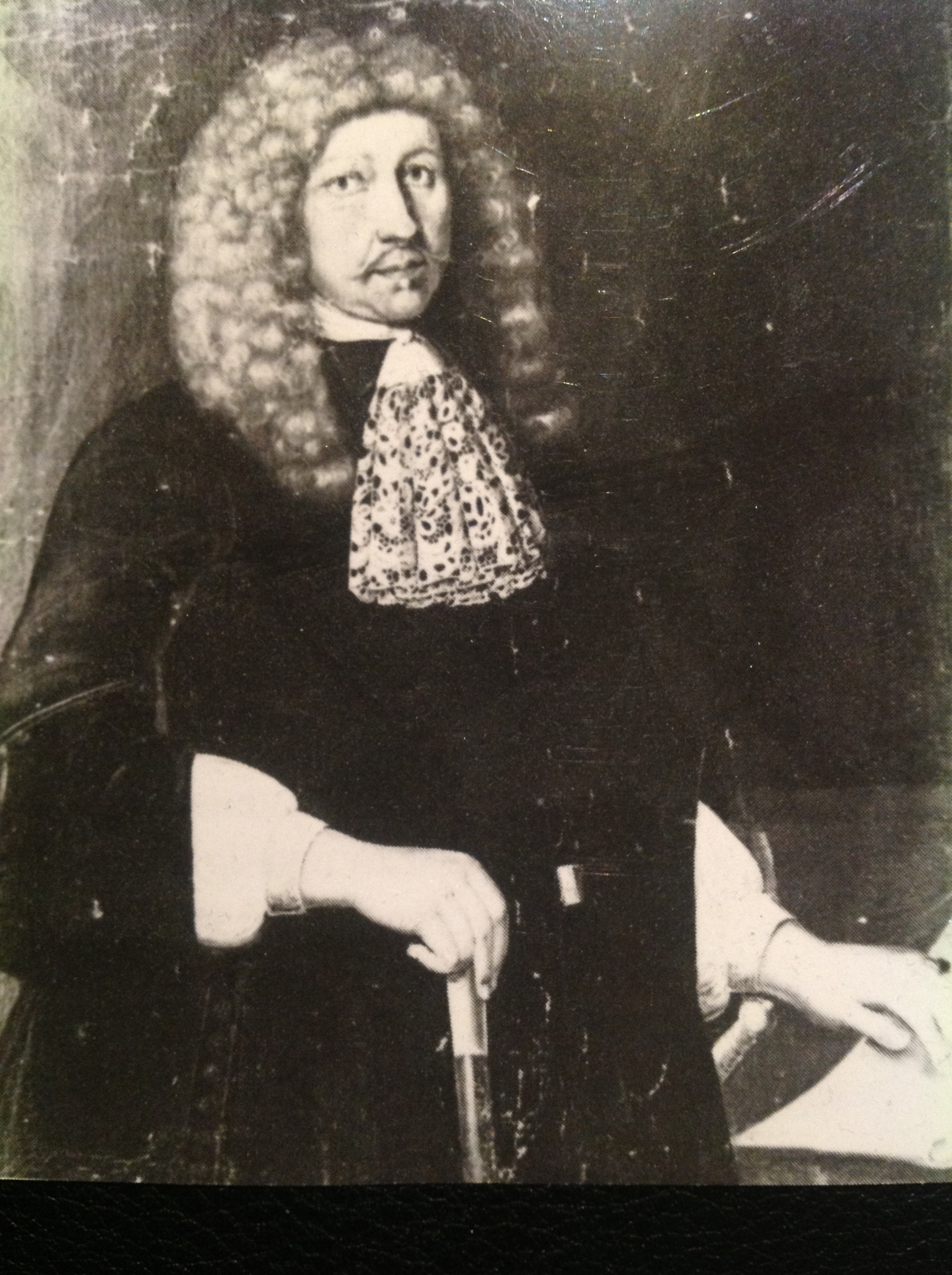
Preben von Ahnen led a campaign through the Junkerdalen in 1659 and allegedly gave the valley its name by doing so.

According to tradition, county clerk and junker Preben von Ahnen (1606–1675) is the one who gave the name to the valley in connection with a campaign to Nasa silver mines in Sweden. In mid-August 1659, Preben von Ahnen went through Junkerdalen with around 100 men, most of them from Saltdal Municipality.

Knut Bergsland has believed that North Norwegian names of this type may have their origin in Sámi, i.e. the Sámi mythological Junkar or "Stohrjunckar", who is a god. The word may have been early borrowed from Sami. The Lule Sámi name is Juńńkárvuobme.

=== Early Sámi settlement ===
Major Peter Schnitler wrote in his border examination protocol from 1742 to 1745 that the Junkerdalen was uninhabitable, but that in the summer there were Sámi who lived there. From Sweden and to Saltdalen through Junkerdalen, only Sámi traveled. Rarely did others go through the valley, but when it happened that someone from Piteås Lapmark came through Junkerdalen, it was in the summer, when the rivers were at their smallest. The journey had to be preferably on foot, and to a small extent one could ride on horseback: "transl. In winter it is not possible to come by horse, or to Fodz: but one must either run on skis, or ride Kieredst, as the Finns do; In the way you go everywhere on the snow over Bierg and Dale." Archaeological investigations show many traces of the Sami's life in Junkerdalen.

Johan Dyring writes a travelogue in 1900 entitled "Junkersdalen and its flora" which was sent to the Ministry of the Church, also printed as an article in Nyt magasin for naturvidenskaberne. This is reproduced in Saltdalsboka 1986. In this article it is mentioned that Junkerdalen was built on in the 19th century. In Skaitidalen, further up, there were clearing men from Rana in 1843 and Swedes settled in Tjørisdalen in 1878. He also stated that nomadic mountain Sami lived in Junkerdalen. In the lower part of Junkerdalen near Solvågli, a Sami burial ground is known. Under Båtfjellet there is also a cave where there was a fireplace, drying poles and other Sami objects.

=== Road to Junkerdalen ===
In the years 1871–1879, a narrow 5.4 kilometres (3.4 mi) long road was built up through Junkerdalsura. The road was laid on a dry-wall embankment between the steep mountain slope and the Junkerdale river. The road was part of a larger road plan from 1867 about a road connection between the Saltenfjorden and Piteå in Norrbotten. During construction, large quantities of dynamite were used for the first time in Nordland. For this work it was, among other things, employed qualified workers from the south of the country.

The road was highly exposed to rock and snow avalanches, and was considered to be rerouted just a few years after it was put into use. A landslide accident in 1955 led to plans for a new road gaining momentum.

Further from the farm Junkerdalen, a road was built to the east over Graddis and inwards towards Sweden. A road was built in the years 1892–1895 from Bleiknes to Junkerdalsura, a stretch of around 13 kilometres (8.1 mi). The facility was divided into five parcels, of which the two most difficult were carried out by the state, and the others by compulsory work organized by Saltdal Municipality.

The road up through Junkerdalsura was widened in the 1920s to open up motorized traffic.

Up in Junkerdalen you can see the listed Djeveldalsbrua. This is a wooden blasting bridge with a span of 17 metres (56 ft). Both the deck and the railing are made of wood. The bridge was built in 1887 in connection with the construction of the road between Junkerdalen and Fjellstuen in Graddis. Parts of the original wood were replaced in 1980, but the dry climate means that the materials are well preserved.

The bridge was one of four blast works bridges that were built on the road construction through Junkerdalen. The bridge was protected by the Directorate for Cultural Heritage on 17 April 2008.

== Cultural monuments ==
The cultural monuments in Junkerdalen show that the area is a traditional Sámi settlement and use area. One represents traces of Sámi adaptation from the hunter-gatherer culture to reindeer nomadism, and permanent settlement in the outback areas. It shows different utilization of mountains, water and river and valley areas. The cultural monuments are also typical of border areas between traditional Sámi and expanding Norwegian settlement.

In the higher parts of the valleys there are traces of the farms' open field mowing, including grassland and haystacks. Outland meadows and haystacks are traces of both Sami and Norwegian cattle herding in the valleys. The cultural monuments are often very vague and difficult to see, and accessibility is poor due to the great distances. They have the greatest value for those who engage in outdoor activities in the area.

== Junkerdalen today ==
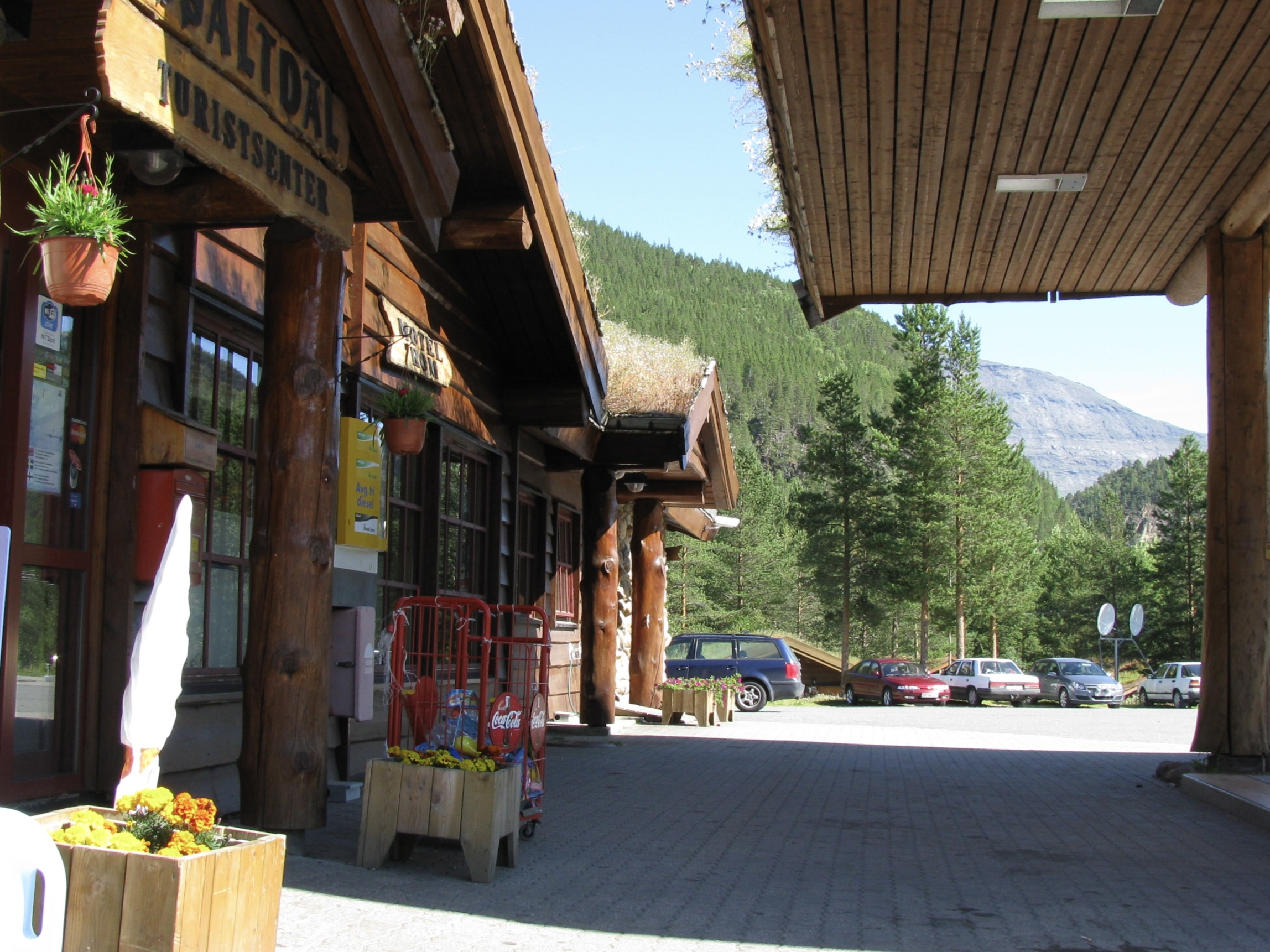
Saltdal tourist center in Storjord is located in the upper parts of Saltdalen, where Junkerdalen starts. Credit: Orcaborealis (July 2008)

County Road 77 was opened to Junkerdal in 1959. The national road to the national border was opened in 1974. County Road 77 used to go high above Junkerdalsura on the south side of this and the side of Kjernfjellet. This was a dangerous stretch of road, especially in winter. The Kjernfjelltunnelen opened on 17 October 2019 and removed this bottleneck.

Today, just under 100 inhabitants live in Junkerdalen. The valley has its own school, combined gymnasium and community center which was built on a donation basis (1995).

The Bodø and Surroundings Tourist Association has laid out hiking trails that are adapted for people with reduced mobility. Along the hiking trails there are picnic areas, picnic areas and campfires.

At Storjord there is a tourist center at the ascent to Junkerdalsura (Saltdal Turistsenter Storjord). The tourist center opened in 1990 and has a roadside inn, a petrol station, hotel rooms and cabins of various standards, a camping site and a children's playground. The Adde Zetterquist art gallery is also located there, along with shops with Sámi applied art.
