= Nasa Mountain =

Mountain on the Norway-Sweden border

- Nasafjellet (Norwegian); Nasafjället (Swedish); Násávárre (Lule Sami)
- Interactive map of the mountain

Highest point
- Elevation: 1,211 m (3,973 ft)
- Coordinates: 66.4834°N 15.3730°E

Geography
- Location: Nordland, Norway; Norrbotten County, Sweden

Nasa Mountain (Swedish: Nasafjället, Norwegian: Nasafjellet, Lule Sami: Násávárre) is a 1,211-metre (3,973 ft) tall mountain that is situated on the border of Sweden and Norway. It is located near Arjeplog in Arjeplog Municipality in western Norrbotten County in Sweden and near Dunderland in Rana Municipality in Nordland county, Norway. There is a marker at the summit of the mountain denoting the border between the two countries. The mountain is best known for the Nasa silver mine. The mining area still has a number of old quarries, some ruins, and a cemetery. There is also a restored miners cottage from 1889 located on the site.
