= Kjernfjelltunnelen =

Tunnel in Saltdal, Nordland, Norway

Kjernfjell Tunnel: Kjernfjelltunnelen (Norwegian); Girnotunælla (Northern Sami)
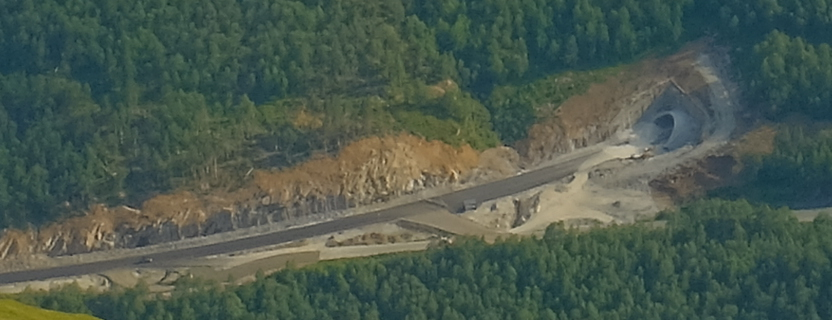
- The eastern entrance to the tunnel
- Interactive map of Kjernfjell Tunnel: Kjernfjelltunnelen (Norwegian); Girnotunælla (Northern Sami)

Overview
- Location: Nordland, Norway
- Coordinates: 66°48′37.08″N 15°27′23.04″E
- Status: In use
- Route: Rv77

Operation
- Opened: 17 October 2019
- Operator: Statens vegvesen

Technical
- Length: 3,248 metres (10,656 ft)
- Tunnel clearance: 4.8 metres (16 ft)

Kjernfjelltunnelen (English: Kjernfjell Tunnel; Lule Sami: Girnotunælla) is a road tunnel on Norwegian National Road 77 (Rv 77) between the village of Storjord in Saltdal Municipality in Nordland county and the national border with Sweden. The tunnel runs through the mountain Kjernfjellet in the Junkerdalen valley. The tunnel has a length of 3,248 metres (2.018 mi).

The construction work began in September 2016, and the tunnel opened to traffic on 17 October 2019.

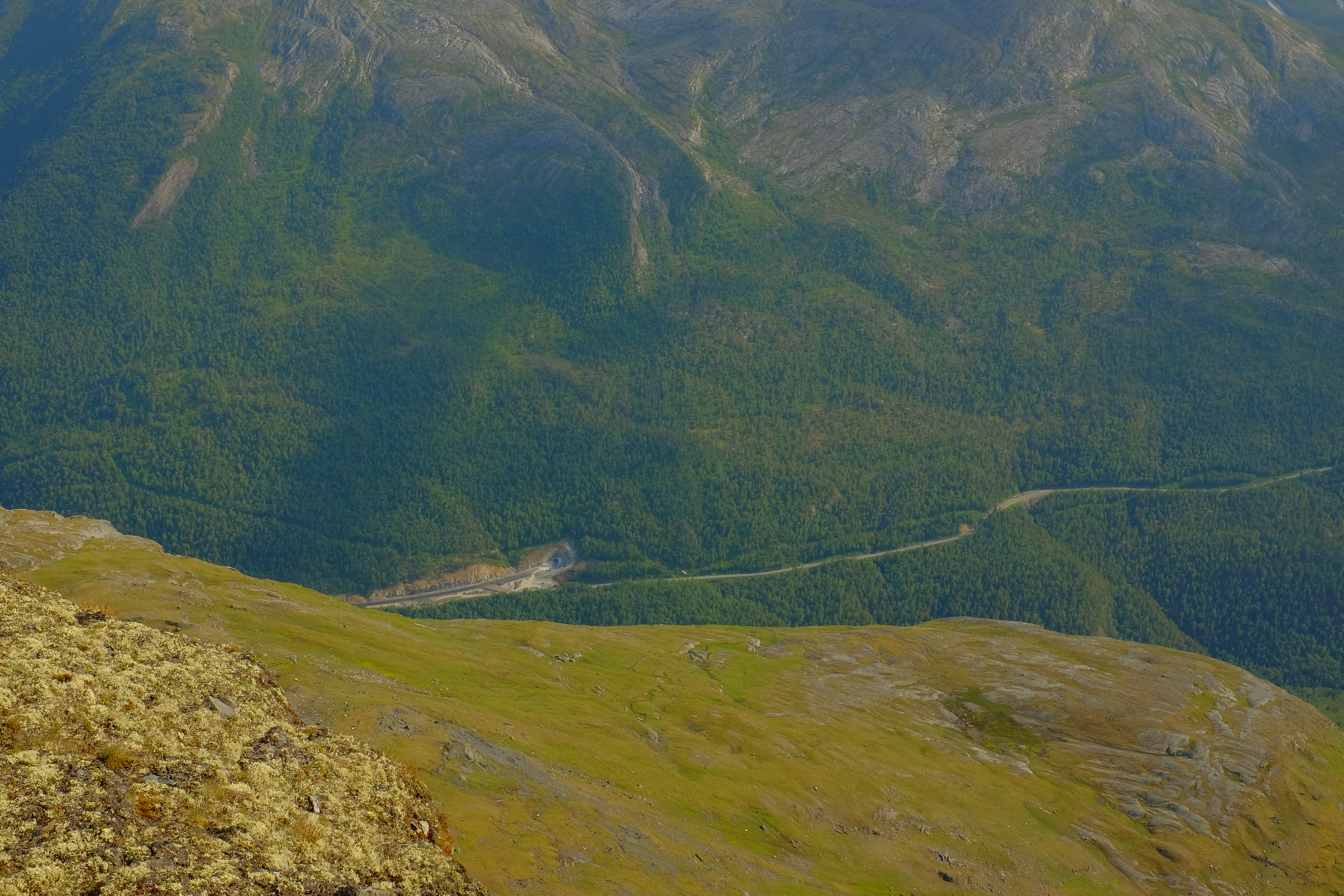
Eastern tunnel opening, the old road along the slope to the right. Credit: Frankemann

The tunnel replaced an exposed stretch of road and a bottleneck along Rv77 connecting Saltdal Municipality (in Norway) and Arjeplog Municipality (in Sweden). The old section passed through a gorge in the lower part of the Junkerdalen valley. The road was narrow, steep, and winding, and large vehicles often got stuck. Detour roads are E12 (Umbukta) and E10 (Bjørnfjell).

== Etymology ==
The name of the tunnel was unclear for a long time, some thought it was Tjernfjelltunnelen and others thought it was Kjernfjelltunnelen, because that was a controversy over the name of the mountain through which the tunnel passes. The Mapping Authority and the Language Council believed that the correct name was "Kjernfjellet" and that it had been used for 184 years. The local residents believed that they had been saying "Tjernfjell" for several generations and that they therefore had the law on their side when it came to being allowed to keep the place name. A map from 1911 shows the spelling "Kjernefjellet".

The Mapping Authority decided in spring 2019 that the spelling Kjernfjellet should be used as the place name for the area. From this it follows that the tunnel is signposted Kjernfjelltunnelen, as well as the Lule Sámi name Girnotunælla.

The Lule Sámi name is disputed, because the tunnel is located in Pite Sámi territory. On 20 August 2019, Pite Sámi became an officially approved written language.

== Internals ==
The tunnel has 27 emergency stations with telephones and fire extinguishers. There are niches where vehicles have the opportunity to turn as well as breakdown pockets. There are six cameras inside the tunnel and two outside the opening. The old stretch of national highway 77 is closed to car traffic and open to pedestrians and cyclists during the summer months. Telenor originally did not want to install mobile coverage in the tunnel because the company assumed that it would not be profitable.

== See also ==
- List of tunnels in Norway
