= Pieljekaise National Park =

National park in Sweden

- Pieljekaise nationalpark
- IUCN category II (national park)
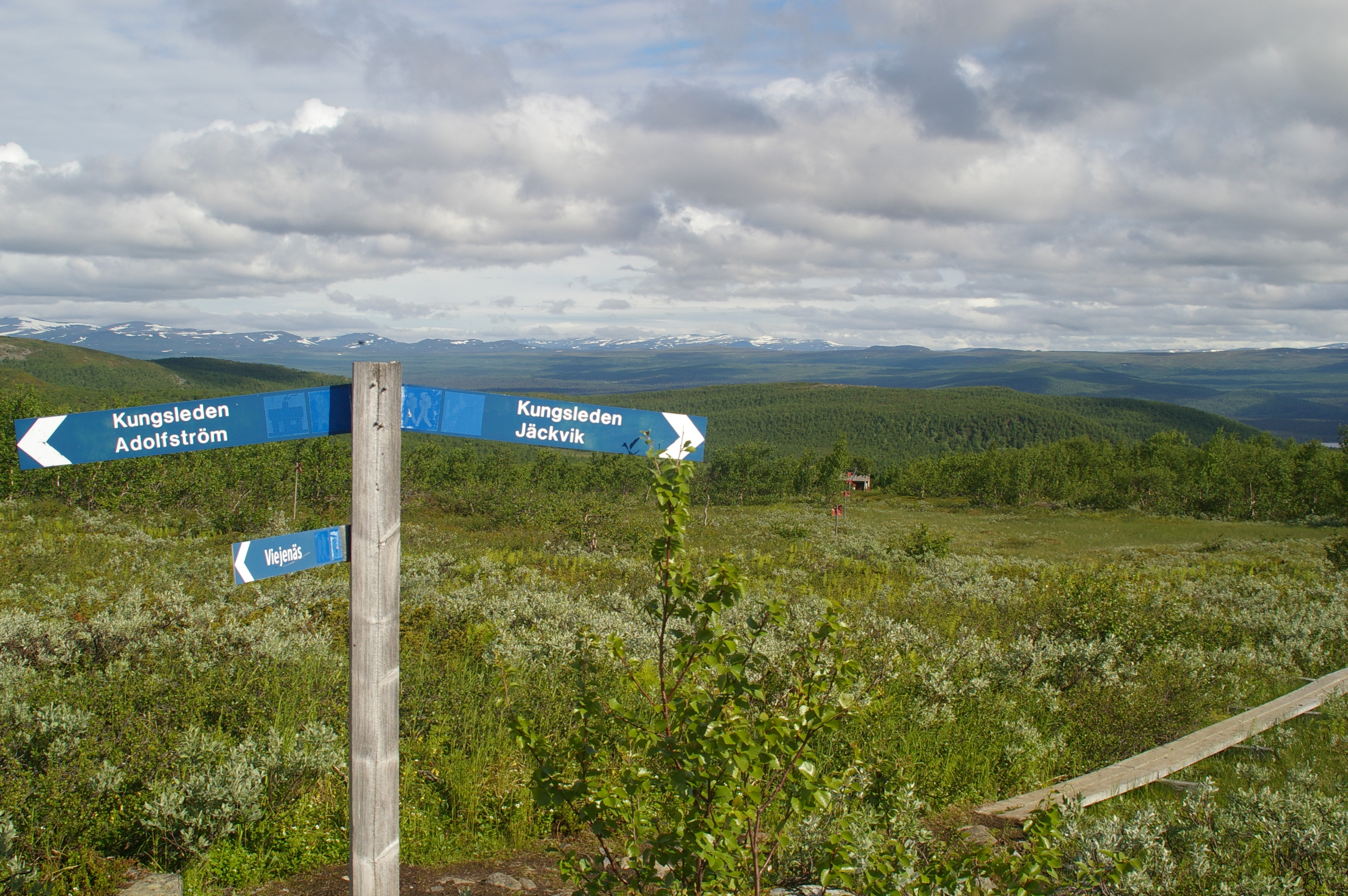
- Above Jäckvik on Kungsleden trail
- Interactive map of Pieljekaise National Park
- Location: Norrbotten County, Sweden
- Coordinates: 66°20′N 16°44′E
- Area: 153.4 km^{2} (59.2 sq mi)
- Established: 1909
- Governing body: Naturvårdsverket

Pieljekaise is a Swedish national park. It lies about 10 km (6.2 mi) south of Jäkkvik in Arjeplog Municipality, Lappland. The park covers an area of 153.4 km^{2} (59.2 sq mi). It consists largely of birch woods. The park is traversed by the Kungsleden hiking trail and the trail continues into the nearby the Vindelfjällens Nature Reserve, one of the largest protected areas in Europe.

== History ==
Pieljekaise was founded in 1909 alongside eight other Swedish national parks.

In 2015, the park was allocated 280000 SEK of national park funding to renovate.

National parks of Sweden (clickable map)
