= Hornavanskolan =

Coordinates: 66°2′50.37″N 17°52′44.84″E

- Arjeplog Municipality; Arjeplog, Lapland; Sweden

Information
- School type: Secondary school
- Founded: 1993
- Teaching staff: 24
- Website: bst.arjeplog.se/

Hornavanskolan is a secondary school in Arjeplog Municipality in Sweden. The school was founded in 1993 and is located by Hornavan, the deepest lake in Sweden. The school cooperates with various car manufacturers such as BMW, Daimler, Knorr-Bremse, Volkswagen AG (Audi), Bosch, GM, Aston Martin, Lotus Cars, Caterham Cars and MIRA Ltd and can offer students of the BilTeknikSystem (car technology system) program temporary internships at national and international automotive companies.

Hornavanskolan also offers a program in construction that's been recommended by The Swedish Construction Industry Training Board, BYN, as well as programs in natural science, business and civics.
