= Junkerdal =

Village in Saltdal Municipality, Norway

- Village
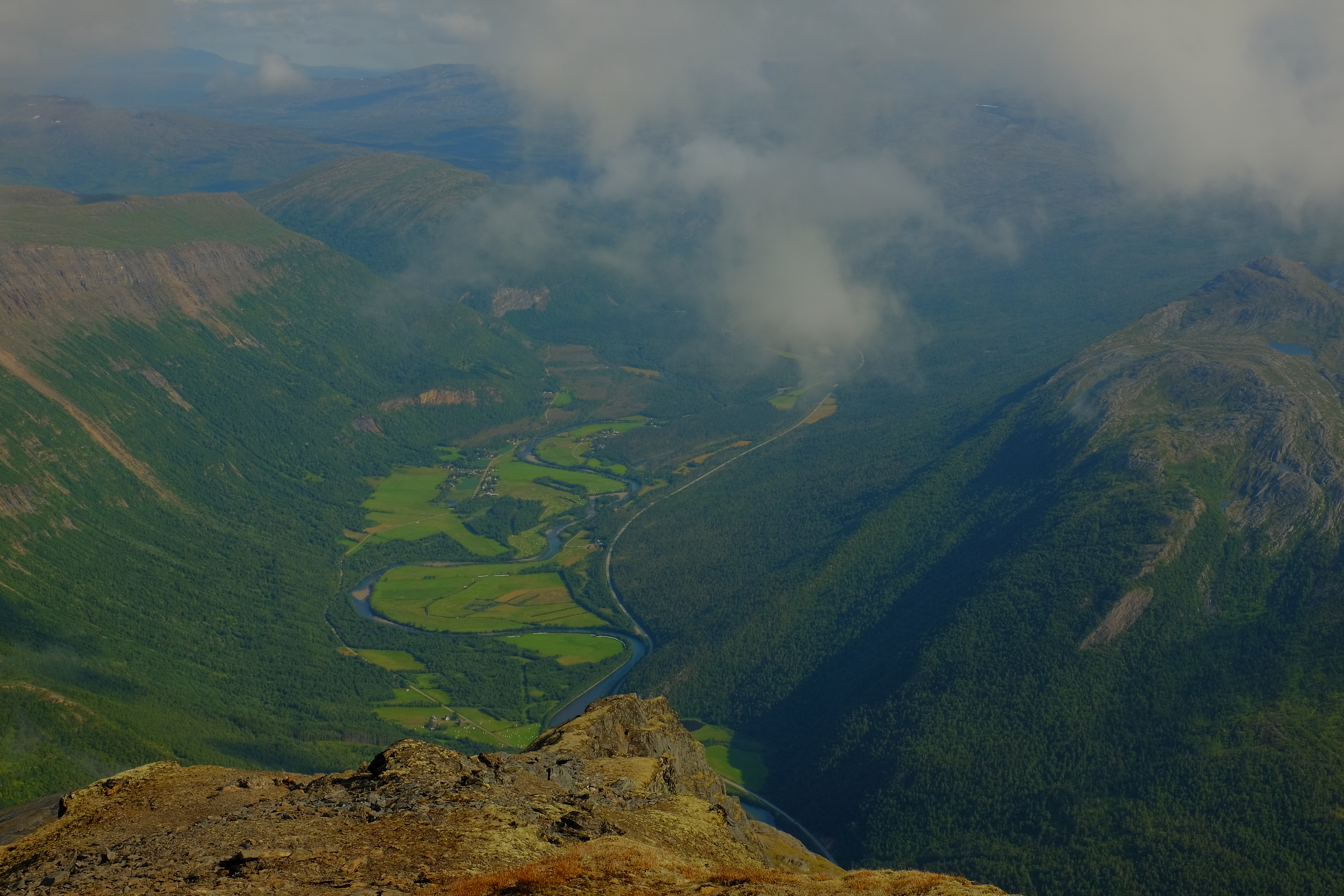
- View of the village, seen from Solvågtinden
- Interactive map of Junkerdal
- Location within Nordland Location within Norway
- Coordinates: 66.80972°N 15.5715°E
- Country: Norway
- Region: Northern Norway
- County: Nordland
- District: Salten
- Municipality: Saltdal Municipality
- Elevation: 210 m (690 ft)
- Time zone: UTC+01:00 (CET)
  - Summer (DST): UTC+02:00 (CEST)
- Post Code: 8255 Røkland

Junkerdal is a village in the Øvre Saltdal area in Saltdal Municipality in Nordland county, Norway, just south of the Junkerdal National Park. The village is located at the innermost part of the Junkerdalen valley, around 33 kilometres (21 mi) south of the municipal center, Rognan. In 2016, the village area and surroundings had a population of 70.
