= Nedre Gautsträsket =

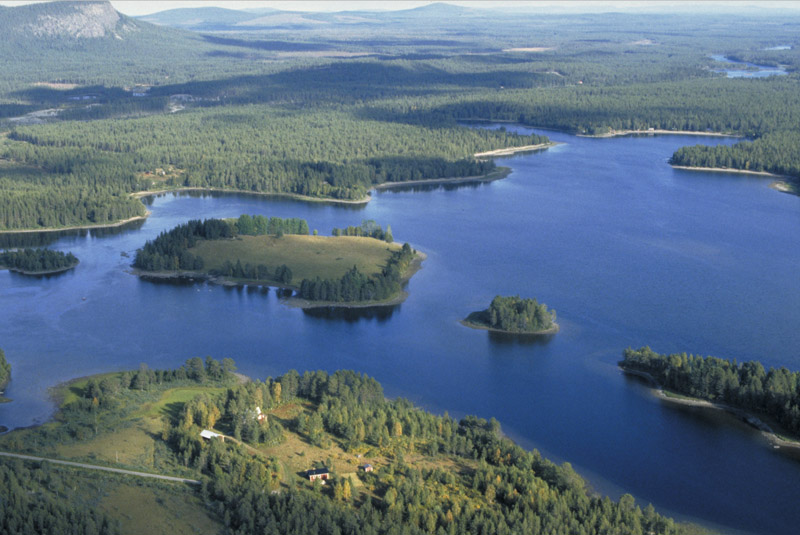
- The northern part of Nedre Gautsträsket at the mouth of Bräskafors and Laisälven.
- Interactive map of Nedre Gautsträsket
- Location: SwedenVästerbotten County, Sorsele Municipality, Lapland, Sweden
- Coordinates: 65°35′20″N 17°28′40″E
- Type: Lake
- Primary outflows: Vindel River
- Catchment area: 5,937.21 square kilometres (2,292.37 sq mi)
- Surface area: 29.02 square kilometres (11.20 sq mi)
- Average depth: 2.8 metres (9 ft 2 in)
- Max. depth: 14.7 metres (48 ft)
- Shore length^{1}: 28.5 kilometres (17.7 mi)
- Surface elevation: 341.1 metres (1,119 ft)
- ^{1} Shore length is not a well-defined measure.

Nedre Gautsträsket is a lake in Sorsele municipality in Lapland and is part of the main catchment area of the Ume River. The lake is 14.7 meters deep, has an area of 10.5 square kilometers and is 341.1 meters above sea level. Nedre Gautsträsket is located in the Vindel River Natura 2000 area. The lake is drained by the Vindel River.

== Sub-basin ==
Nedre Gautsträsket is part of the sub-basin (727911-157661) that SMHI calls the outlet of Nedre Gautsträsket. The average altitude is 355 meters above sea level and the area is 29.02 square kilometers. If the 345 catchment areas upstream are included, the accumulated area is 5 937.21 square kilometers. The Vindelälven river that drains the catchment area has tributary order 2, which means that the water flows through a total of 2 watercourses before reaching the sea after 323 kilometers. The catchment area consists mostly of forest (45 percent). The catchment area has 10.5 square kilometers of water surface, giving it a lake percentage of 36.2%.
