= Iraft =

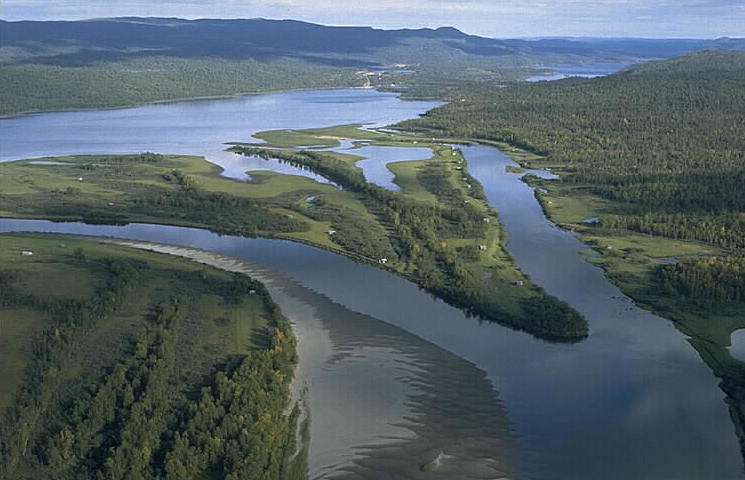
- Interactive map of Iraft
- Location: Arjeplog Municipality, Norrbotten County, Lapland, Sweden
- Coordinates: 66°17′07″N 16°36′55″E
- Average depth: 7.3 metres (24 ft)
- Max. depth: 28 metres (92 ft)
- Water volume: 19,500,000 m^{3} (690,000,000 cu ft)
- Shore length^{1}: 19.9 kilometres (12.4 mi)
- ^{1} Shore length is not a well-defined measure.

Iraft is a lake in Arjeplog municipality in Lapland, Sweden. It is part of the main catchment area of the Ume River. The village of Adolfsström is located by the lake. The Iraft delta, where the holiday village of Bäverholmen is located, flows into the southwestern part of the lake. The lake is 28 metres deep, has an area of 3.06 square kilometres and is 455.6 metres above sea level. Iraft is located in the Laisälven Natura 2000 area. The King's Trail (Kungsleden) runs along the northern shore of Iraft, rounding Ahaviken in the northwest and passing Bäverholmen.

== Sub-basin ==
Iraft is part of the sub-basin that SMHI calls the Iraft outlet. Its average altitude is 594 metres above sea level and its surface area is 46.63 square kilometres. If the 48 upstream catchment areas are included, the cumulative area is 1 195,77 square kilometres. The Laisälven river that drains the catchment area has tributary order 3, which means that the water flows through a total of 3 watercourses before reaching the sea after 444 kilometres. The catchment area consists mostly of forest (66%) and bare rock (16%). The catchment area has 3.84 square kilometres of water surface, which gives it a lake percentage of 8.2%.

== Gallery ==
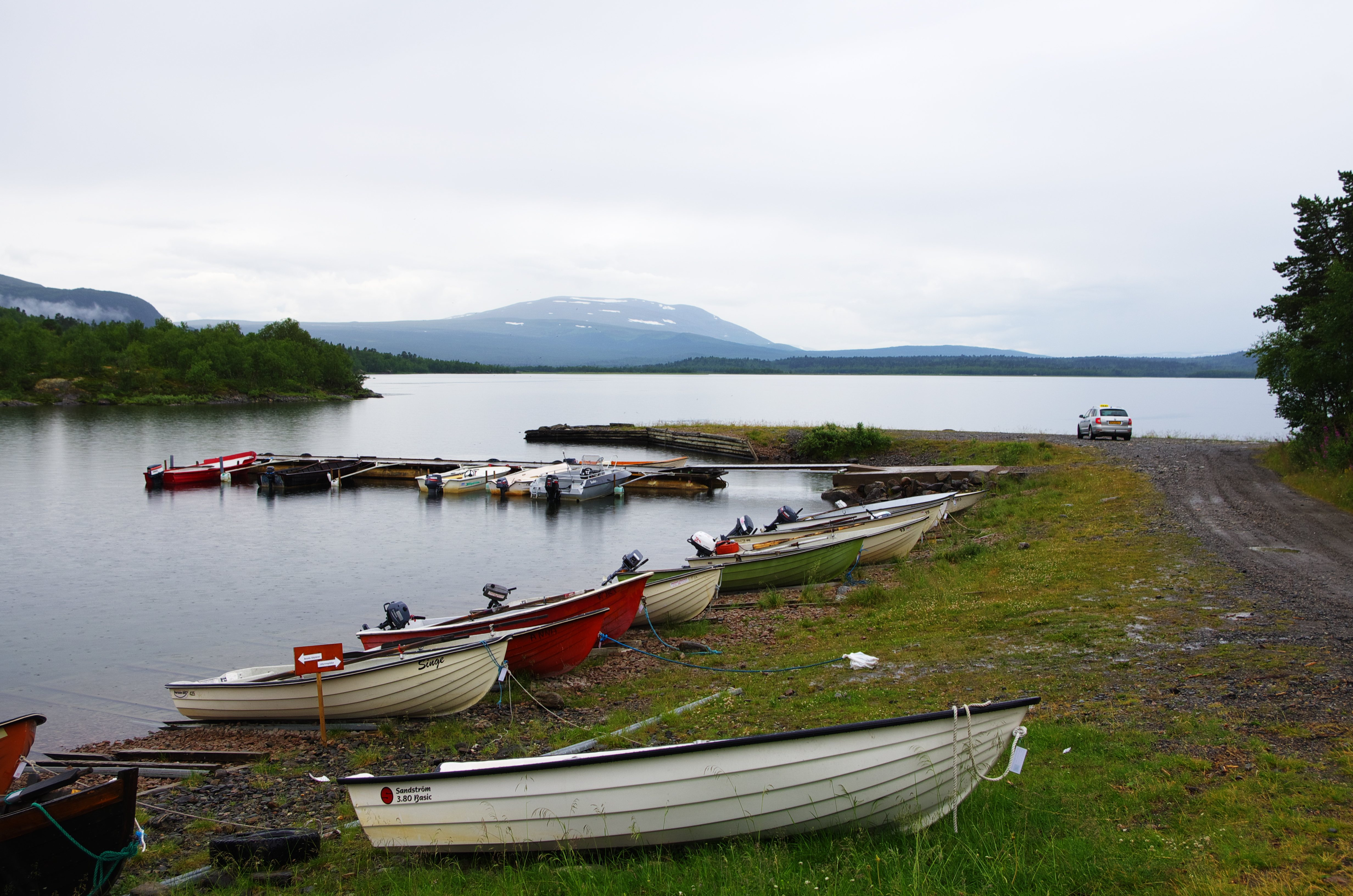

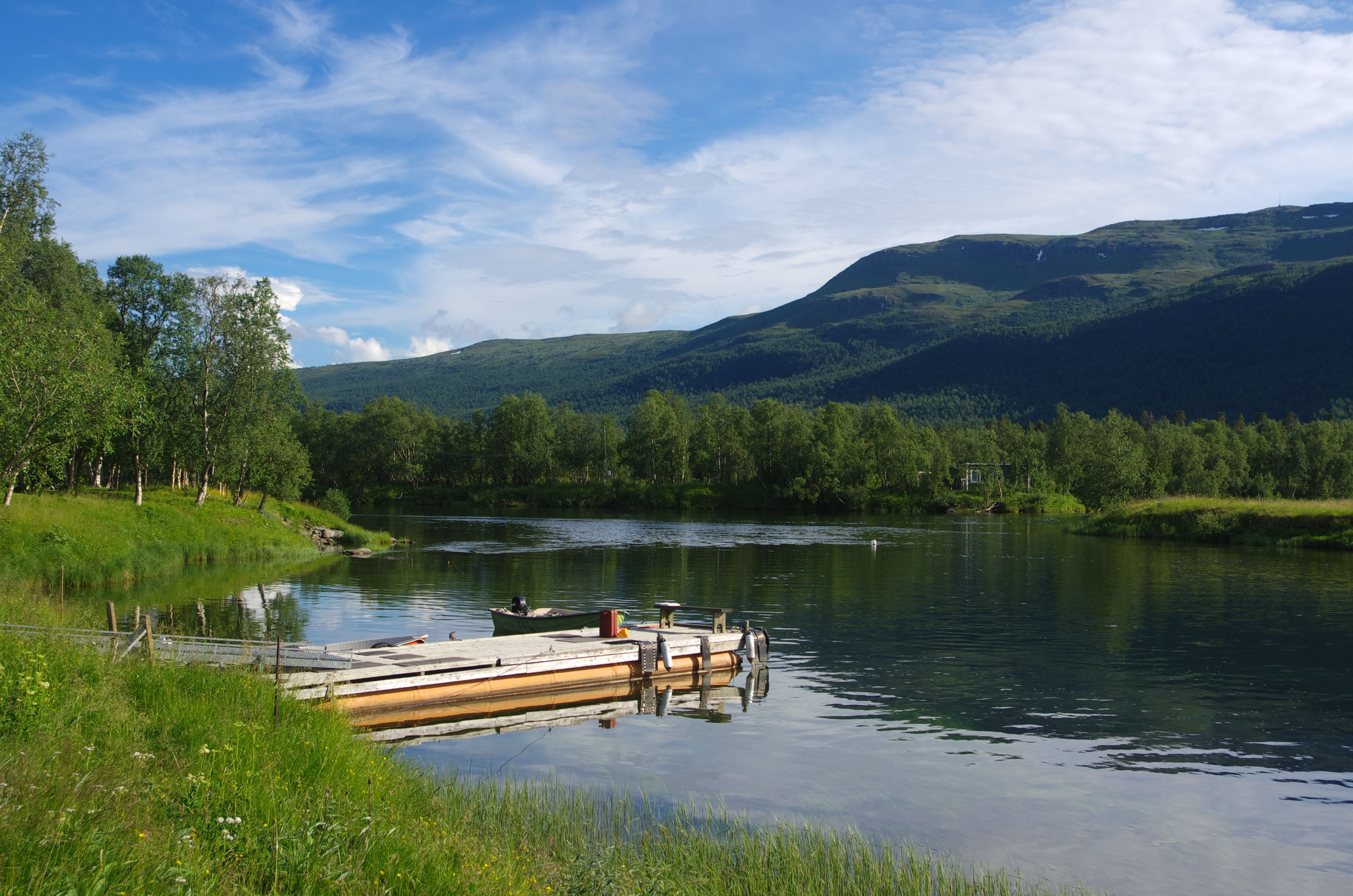

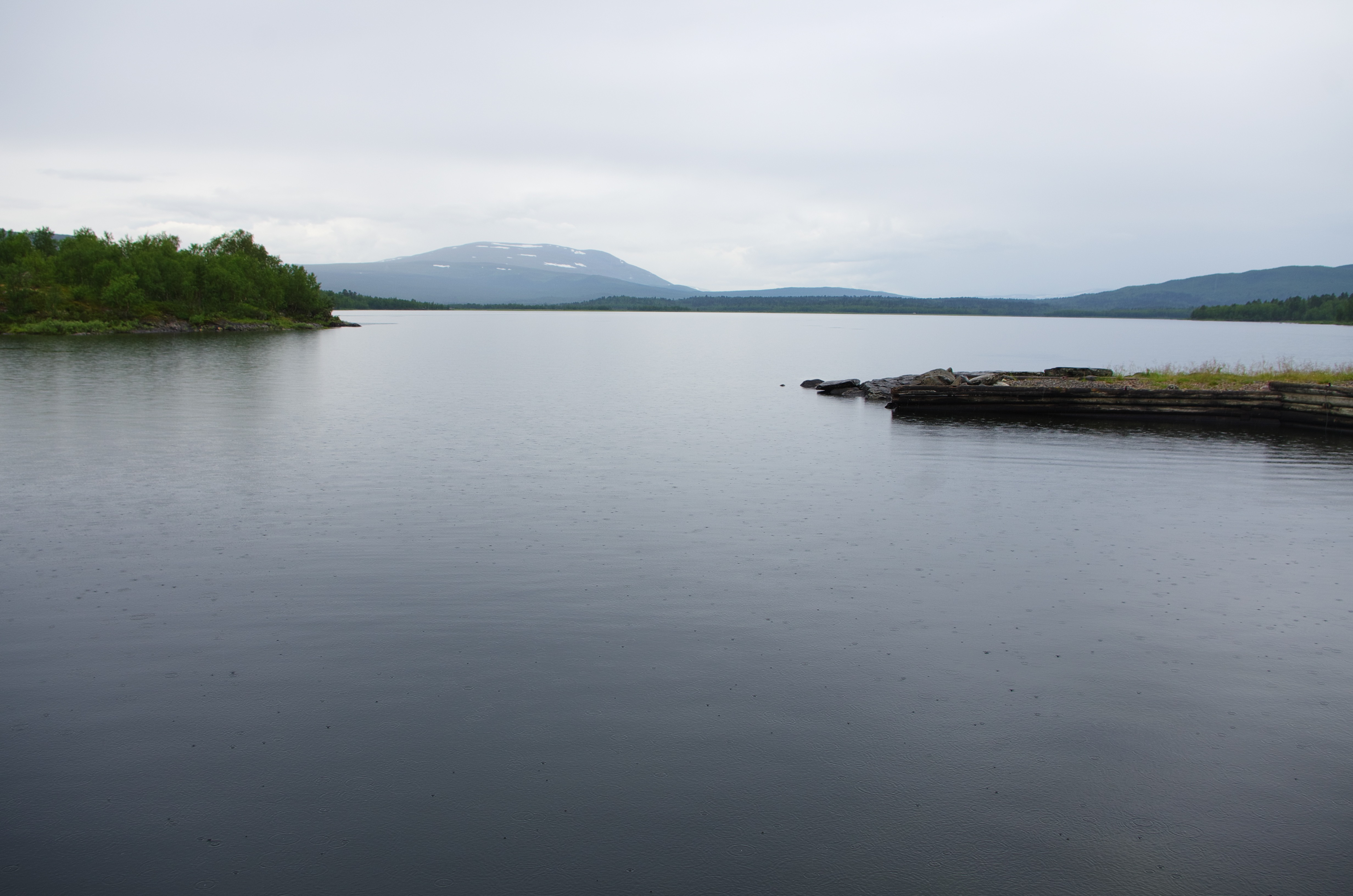

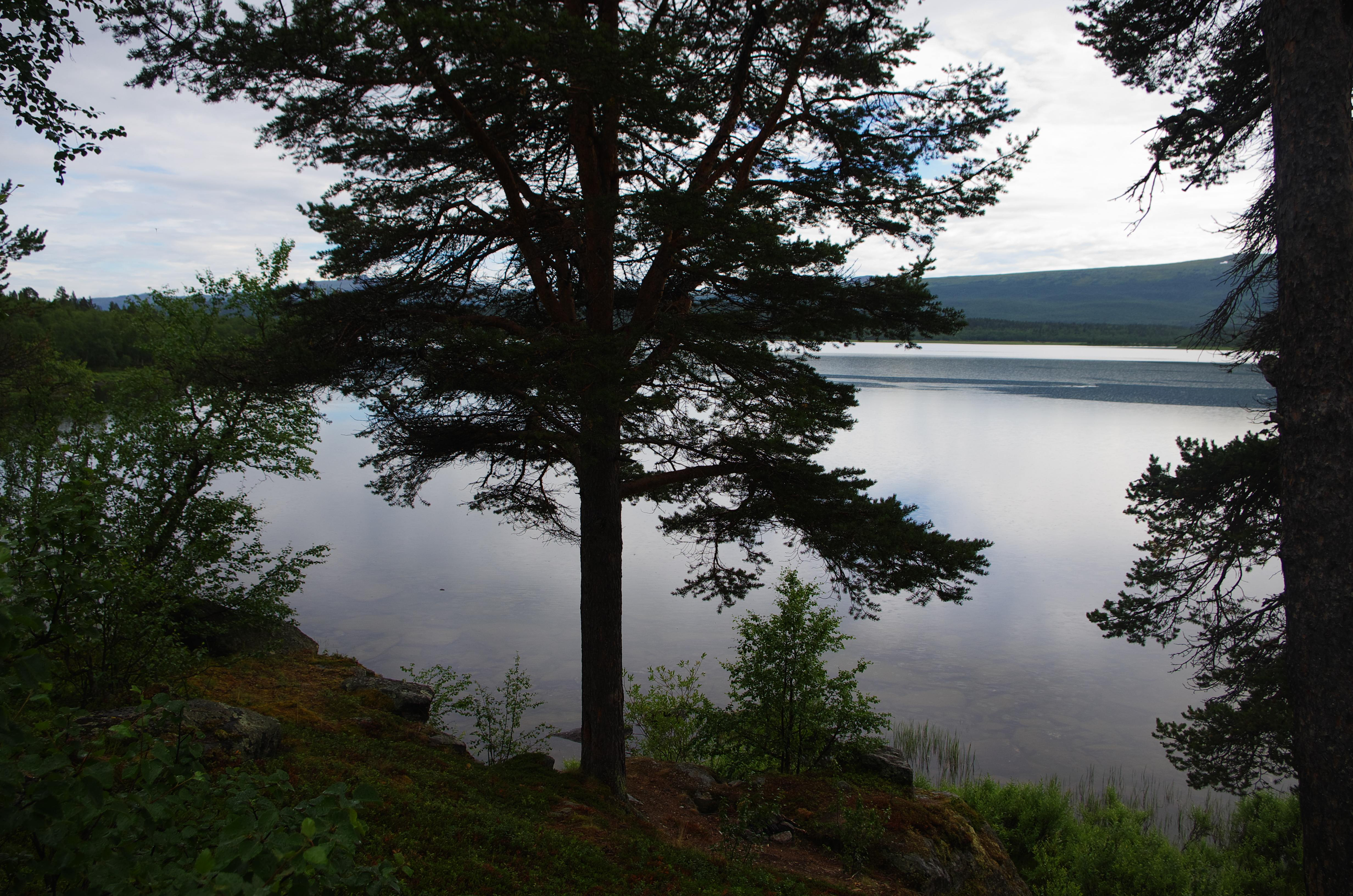
