= Jäkkvik =

Coordinates: 66°23′N 16°58′E

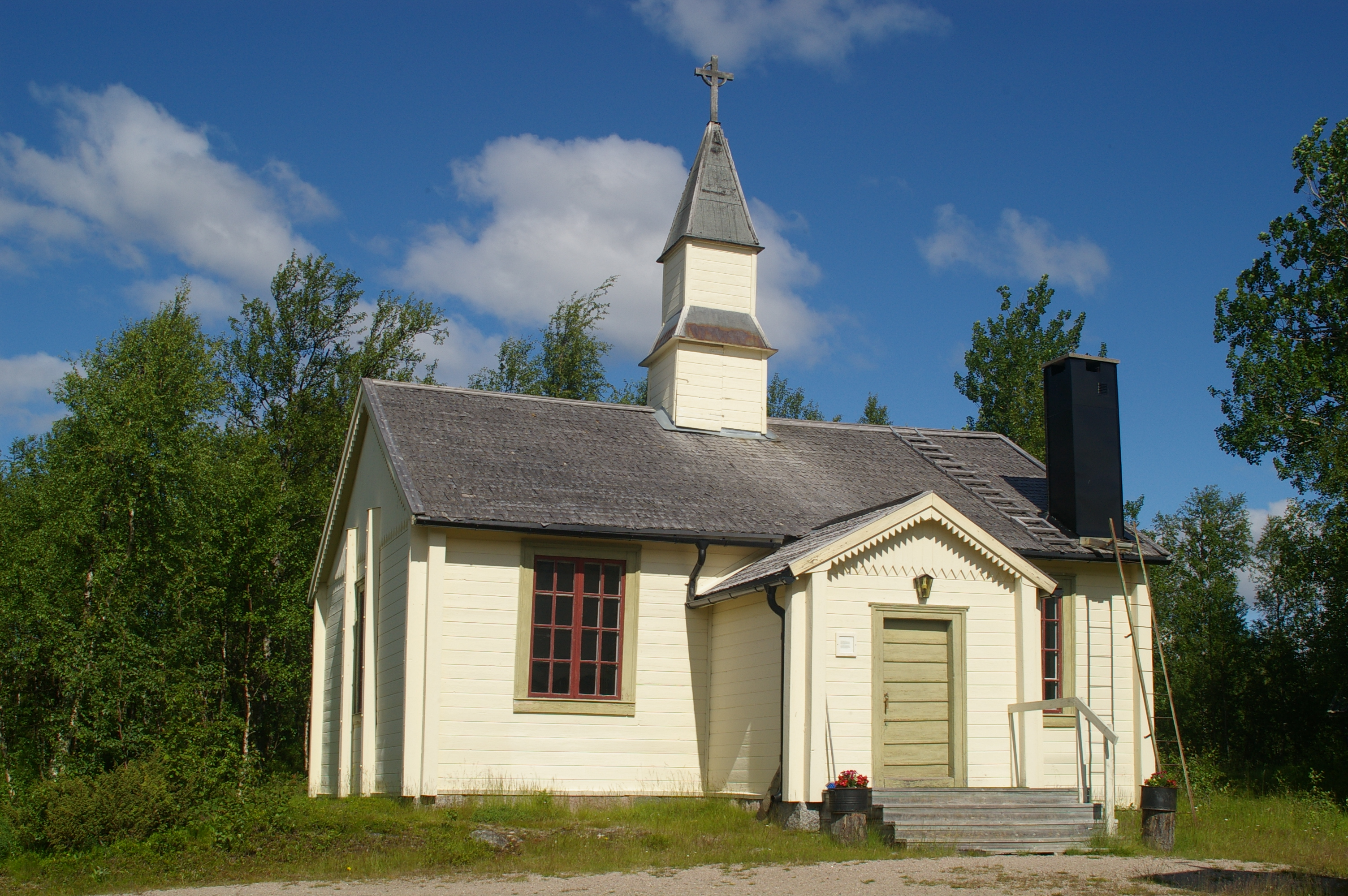
- Jäckvik Church
- Interactive map of Jäkkvik
- Country: Sweden
- County: Norrbotten County
- Municipality: Arjeplog Municipality
- Time zone: UTC+1 (CET)
  - Summer (DST): UTC+2 (CEST)

Jäckvik (pronounced [jæːkkviːk]) or Jäkkvik is a mountain hamlet in Arjeplog municipality on Swedish national road 95 (Silver Road). It is located near Pieljekaise National Park and about 20 km south of the Arctic Circle. Jäckvik has a lodge and a ski run. Continuing north along Swedish National Road 95, towards the border with Norway, there is the nearby tourist facilities Vuoggatjålme and the lake Vuoggatjålmjaure.

The Swedish priest Lars Levi Læstadius was born in Jäckvik.
