= Nasa silver mine =

Coordinates: 66°28′26″N 15°24′12″E

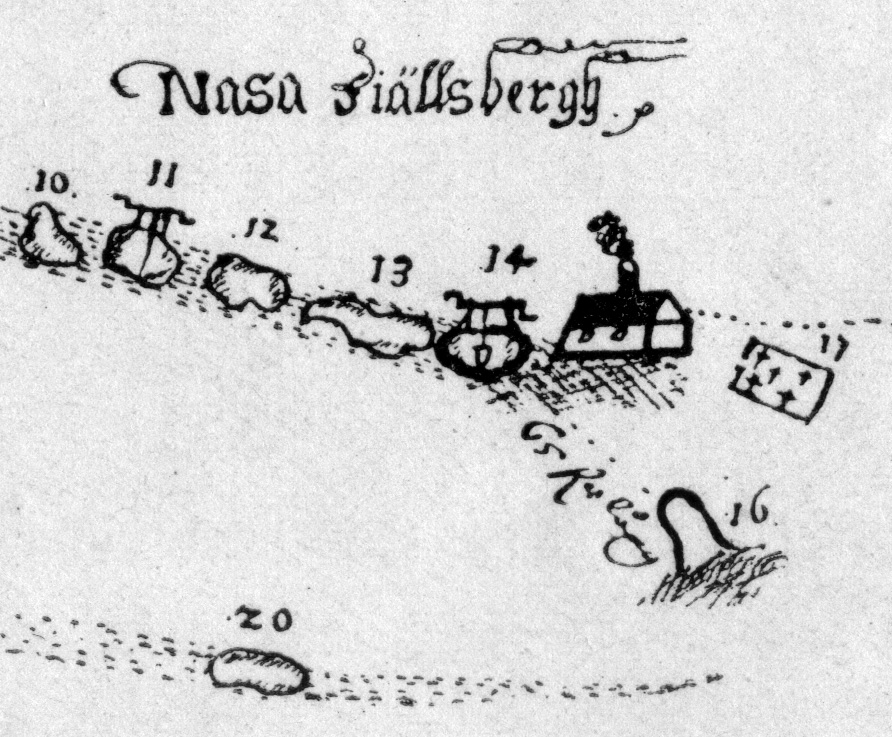
A map of the silver mines from 1646

The Nasa (Nasafjäll) silver mine (Swedish: Nasa silvergruva), located on Nasa Mountain on the border between Sweden and Norway, was used for mining silver, mainly from 1635 to 1659 and from 1770 to 1810. Smelting occurred during the first period (1635-1659) at Skellefteälven; during the second period (1770–1810) at Adolfström in Arjeplog .

== History ==
=== First phase ===
It was an indigenous Sami man by the name of Peder Olofsson who had made the first discovery of ore. The mine never delivered much silver: about 860 kg, plus 250 tons of lead during the first period and 110 kilos of silver and 21 tons of lead during the second period. It was historically important, as it contributed to the development of infrastructure in this part of Lapland, most notably the Nasa trail and the city of Arjeplog. It marked the beginning of Sweden's efforts to become a major power. Many men were conscripted to work the mines, and were noted to have been worked hard and brutishly, along with receiving little or none of their wages of flour, salt, tobacco and liquor. It was found that the foreman Isak Tiock had been keeping most of the wages for himself as well as cruelly treating those who would not work. Afterwards a royal commission imprisoned him and had all debts paid.

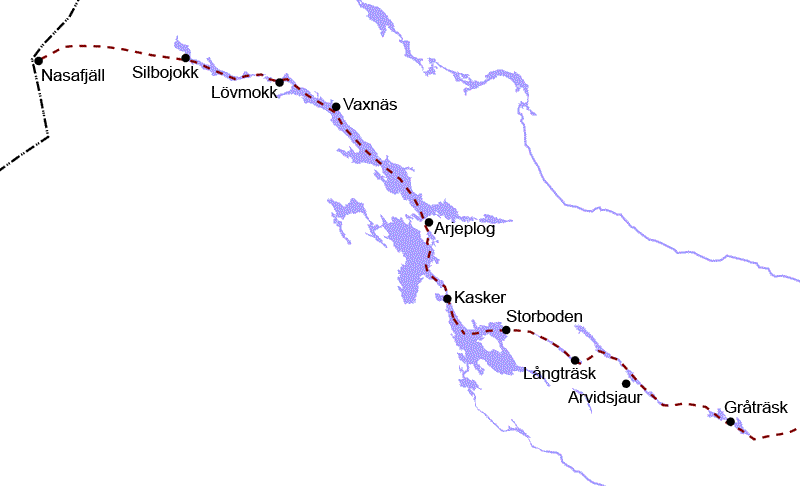
The main supply route for the mine, worked by the Sami and their reindeer

Operations during the first period (1635–1659) were carried out with forced recruited labor. The Sami were not forced to work in the mines but were conscripted into supply and transport work using their sleds and reindeer. They would take the ore for smelting in Silbojokk, about 60 km away, however many fled to Norway to escape the harsh work on themselves and their animals. In August 1659, a Norwegian invasion force under the command of Preben von Ahnen (1606–1675), came over the mountains plundering and burning the mine, bringing an end to the operations.

=== Second phase ===
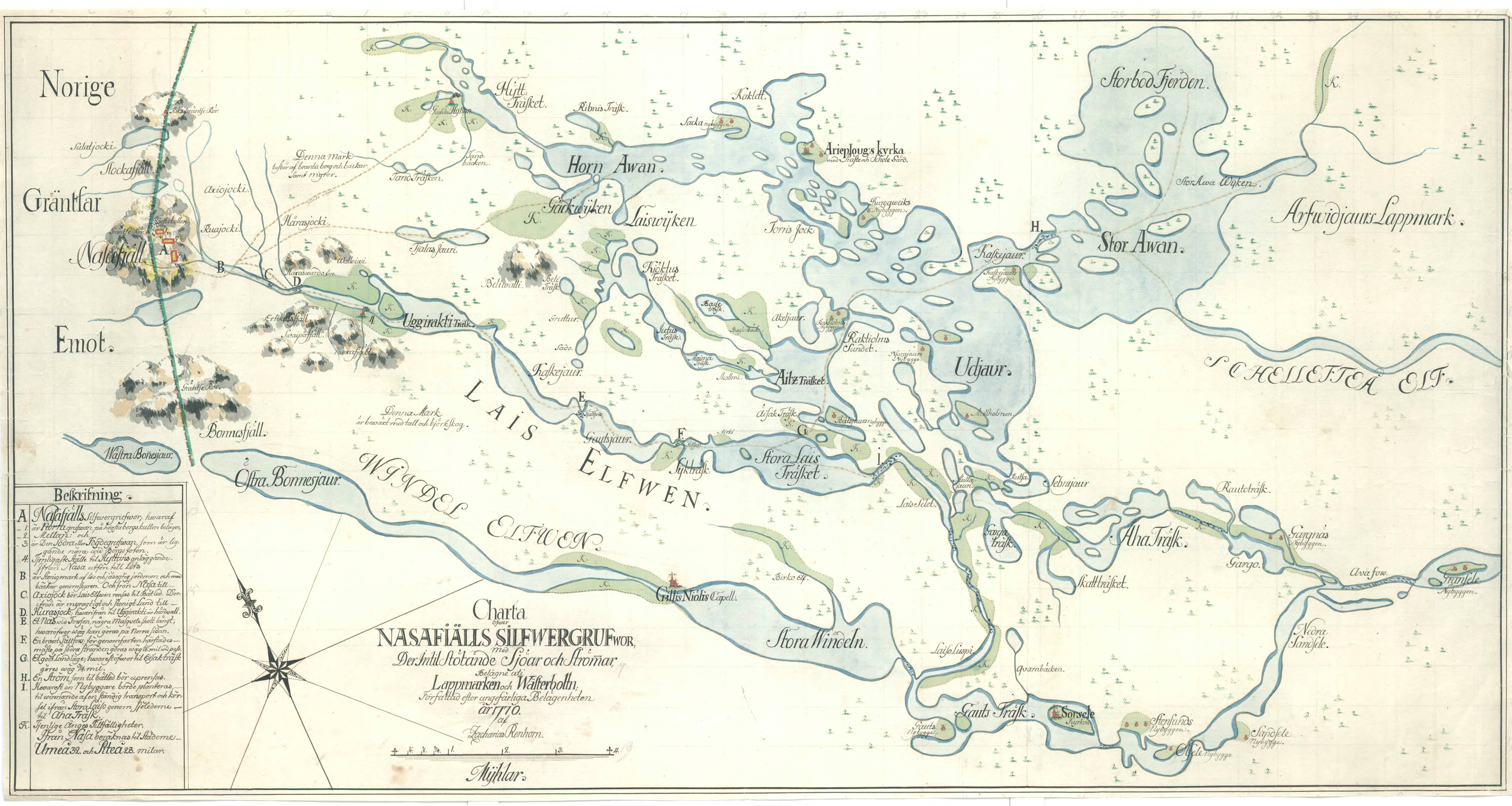
Map from 1770 of the Nasafjäll silver mines with adjacent lakes.

The mine was deserted until the late 1770s when a new attempt was made to mine ore at Nasafjäll. A new mining company was formed in 1770 with mining privileges granted on February 17, 1774. Mining was conducted on a small scale. The first smelting of ore was made in the autumn of 1775. The mining operation continued with severe difficulties, and silver production remained insignificant. Major Georg Bogislaus Staël von Holstein took ownership in autumn 1801. In 1810 the mining operation at Nasafjäll and smelting at Adolfström completely ceased.

== Other Sources ==
- Forsgren, Eric (2008) Nasafjäll - Silverfjället : ett omänskligt gruvprojekt (Lidingö:Eric Forsgren) ISBN 978-91-633-3402-3
- Abrahamsson, Tore (2009) Drömmar av silver: Silververket i Kvikkjokk 1660–1702 – fritt efter verkligheten (Malmö: Arena) ISBN 978-91-7843-312-4
- Lundmark, Fridolf (1965) Adolfström - en kort sammanfattning av den lilla silverbyns historia (U. Öhlund)
