= Arjeplog =

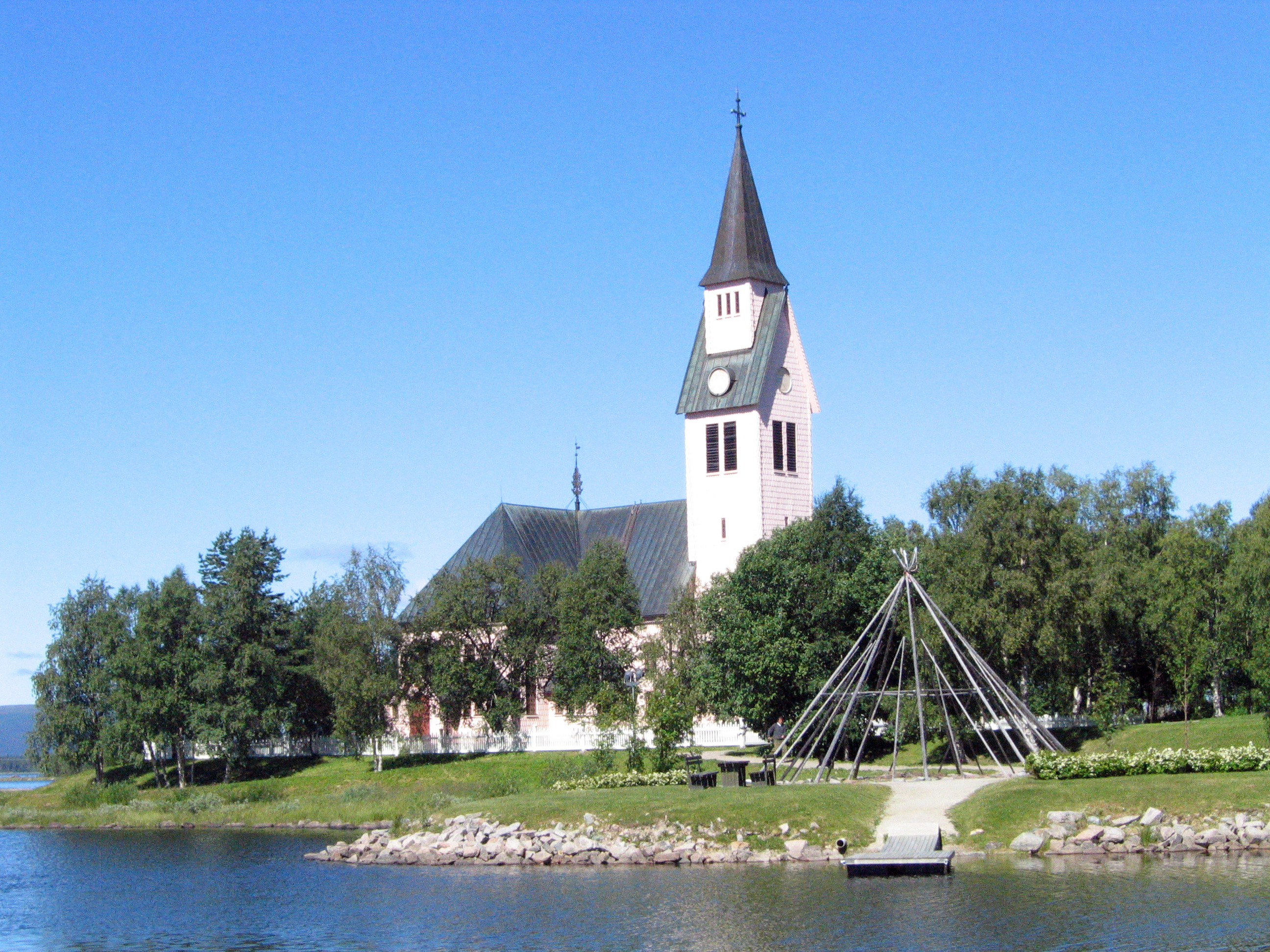
- Arjeplog Church

- Coat of arms

- Location within Norrbotten Location within Sweden
- Coordinates: 66°03′N 17°53′E
- Country: Sweden
- Province: Lapland
- County: Norrbotten County
- Municipality: Arjeplog Municipality

Area
  - Total: 2.29 km^{2} (0.88 sq mi)

Population (31 December 2010)
  - Total: 1,977
  - Density: 863/km^{2} (2,240/sq mi)
- Time zone: UTC+1 (CET)
  - Summer (DST): UTC+2 (CEST)

Arjeplog (Swedish: [ˈǎrːjɛplʊɡ]; Pite Sami: Árjepluovve) is a locality and the seat of Arjeplog Municipality in Norrbotten County, province of Lapland, Sweden with 1,977 inhabitants in 2010.

It is a popular winter test site for the Asian and European car industries and featured on an episode of the British TV show Top Gear.

Arjeplog has in the past offered families 100,000 kronor, or individuals 25,000 kronor to move to the town.

== History ==
The name, first recorded in 1636 as the name of the Sami village and in 1640 as the church and marketplace, is a Swedish adaptation of Árjepluovve. The suffix is pluovve, meaning 'wet marsh,' while the prefix contains the genitive of (h)árijje, meaning 'ridge'.

Arjeplog is known for, among other things, "the Lapland doctor" Einar Wallquist's creation, the Silver Museum, which was inaugurated in 1965. Arjeplog is a church village in the Arjeplog parish that, when the 1862 municipal reform was implemented in Lapland, formed Arjeplog Rural Municipality in 1874. The Rural Municipality was, in 1971, transformed without changes into Arjeplog Municipality with Arjeplog as the central locality.

== Climate ==
Arjeplog has a subarctic climate (Dfc) typical of northern Sweden. Its winters are somewhat moderated by the mild maritime North Atlantic air to the west, although they are still very cold, long and snowy. Summers are short but can occasionally be warm and they are also very bright due to Arjeplog's position close to the Arctic Circle. Daylight is sparse in winter, but during summer midnight sun is present for three weeks. For an even longer period than that it does not get dark in Arjeplog. The presence of the midnight sun is in spite of Arjeplog being below the Arctic Circle, and is caused by the sun's trajectory not quite dropping below 0° in angle. As it is below the line Arjeplog does not experience complete lack of daylight during the winter solstice, but it is limited to less than three hours.

Arjeplog is located on the lake of Hornavan, that freezes over every winter due to the cold temperatures, whereas the lake temperatures remain cool also in summer.

Climate data for Arjeplog; 2002–2018 averages; extremes since 1945
Month	Jan	Feb	Mar	Apr	May	Jun	Jul	Aug	Sep	Oct	Nov	Dec	Year
Record high °C (°F)	8.0 (46.4)	7.2 (45.0)	11.2 (52.2)	16.3 (61.3)	26.9 (80.4)	31.5 (88.7)	30.5 (86.9)	27.8 (82.0)	23.8 (74.8)	15.8 (60.4)	9.6 (49.3)	8.2 (46.8)	31.5 (88.7)
Mean maximum °C (°F)	2.2 (36.0)	3.4 (38.1)	5.7 (42.3)	11.3 (52.3)	20.1 (68.2)	23.6 (74.5)	24.7 (76.5)	23.4 (74.1)	17.9 (64.2)	10.4 (50.7)	4.7 (40.5)	3.5 (38.3)	26.0 (78.8)
Mean daily maximum °C (°F)	−7.8 (18.0)	−6.2 (20.8)	−1.4 (29.5)	4.3 (39.7)	10.6 (51.1)	15.5 (59.9)	19.2 (66.6)	16.8 (62.2)	11.3 (52.3)	3.6 (38.5)	−2.4 (27.7)	−5.0 (23.0)	4.9 (40.8)
Daily mean °C (°F)	−12.1 (10.2)	−10.6 (12.9)	−6.3 (20.7)	−0.3 (31.5)	5.8 (42.4)	10.9 (51.6)	14.6 (58.3)	12.5 (54.5)	7.7 (45.9)	0.9 (33.6)	−5.5 (22.1)	−9.0 (15.8)	0.7 (33.3)
Mean daily minimum °C (°F)	−16.4 (2.5)	−15.0 (5.0)	−11.1 (12.0)	−4.8 (23.4)	1.0 (33.8)	6.3 (43.3)	9.9 (49.8)	8.2 (46.8)	4.1 (39.4)	−1.9 (28.6)	−8.5 (16.7)	−12.9 (8.8)	−3.4 (25.8)
Mean minimum °C (°F)	−31.1 (−24.0)	−30.1 (−22.2)	−24.9 (−12.8)	−15.4 (4.3)	−5.2 (22.6)	0.7 (33.3)	4.1 (39.4)	2.0 (35.6)	−2.5 (27.5)	−9.9 (14.2)	−20.4 (−4.7)	−27.5 (−17.5)	−33.6 (−28.5)
Record low °C (°F)	−41.8 (−43.2)	−41.5 (−42.7)	−37.1 (−34.8)	−27.8 (−18.0)	−14.5 (5.9)	−3.0 (26.6)	0.0 (32.0)	−2.0 (28.4)	−7.2 (19.0)	−22.9 (−9.2)	−34.0 (−29.2)	−42.2 (−44.0)	−42.2 (−44.0)
Average precipitation mm (inches)	35.1 (1.38)	27.6 (1.09)	25.8 (1.02)	25.4 (1.00)	36.7 (1.44)	54.0 (2.13)	84.1 (3.31)	69.8 (2.75)	52.6 (2.07)	40.2 (1.58)	38.9 (1.53)	40.2 (1.58)	530.4 (20.88)
Source 1: SMHI Open Data
Source 2: SMHI climate data 2002–2018

== See also ==
- Hornavan
- Hornavanskolan
