= Arjeplog Municipality =

Arjeplog Municipality Arjeplogs kommun
- Municipality
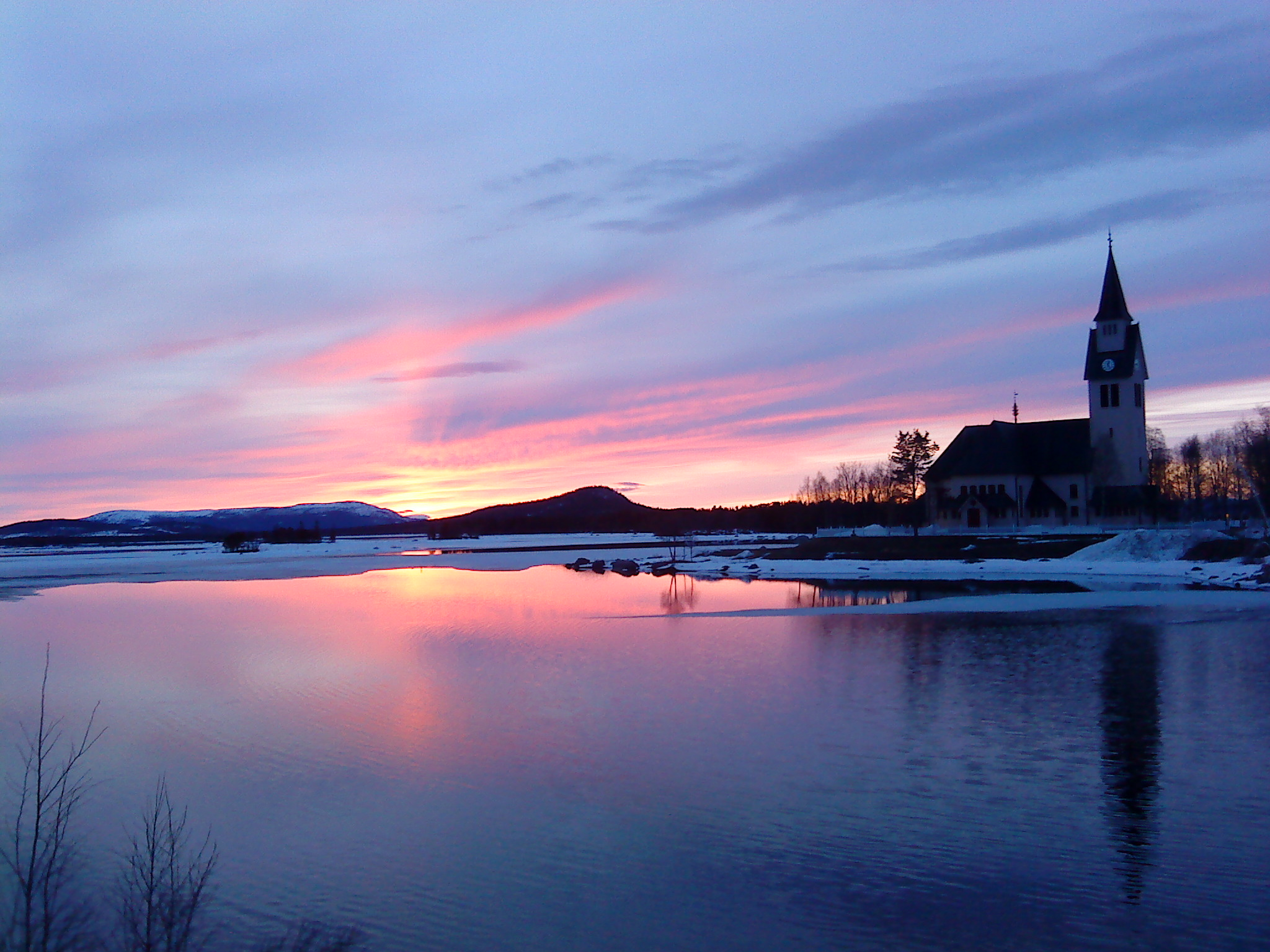

- Coat of arms

- Coordinates: 66°02′N 17°57′E
- Country: Sweden
- County: Norrbotten County
- Seat: Arjeplog

Area
  - Total: 14,494.09 km^{2} (5,596.20 sq mi)
  - Land: 12,556.77 km^{2} (4,848.20 sq mi)
  - Water: 1,937.32 km^{2} (748.00 sq mi)
- Area as of 1 January 2014.

Population (30 June 2025)
  - Total: 2,578
  - Density: 0.2053/km^{2} (0.5317/sq mi)
- Time zone: UTC+1 (CET)
  - Summer (DST): UTC+2 (CEST)
- ISO 3166 code: SE
- Province: Lapland
- Municipal code: 2506
- Website: www.arjeplog.se

Arjeplog Municipality (Swedish: Arjeplogs kommun, Northern Sami: Arjepluovvi gielda; Pite Sami: Árjepluove komuvdna) is a municipality in Norrbotten County in northern Sweden. Its seat is located in Arjeplog.

The area, which now is Arjeplog Municipality, used to be a single parish (Swedish: socken), which was made into a municipality when the first Swedish local government acts were implemented in 1863. It has not been amalgamated with any other entity. In terms of geographical area, Arjeplog is one of Sweden's largest, but it is also the country's least densely populated municipality. The vast majority of the populace live in Arjeplog, which is one of Sweden's smallest municipal seats.

== History ==
People lived in the area of today's municipality as early as 10,000 years ago, following the end of the last ice age. For a long time it was only populated by a fishing and hunting people, the Sami people, who have their own language and breed reindeer in northern Sweden, and today have special rights as a Swedish minority group.

The population in today's municipality was only a few hundred people in the 17th and 18th century, most of them Sami, and the rest of Sweden did not know much of them. Not until 1640 did Queen Christina of Sweden order a church to be built in order to Christianize the Sami people in Arjeplog. The church was inaugurated in 1642. At first the deceased were buried under the earthen floor in the church, but eventually the stench became unbearable and the procedure had to end.

=== Silver ===
The interest in Arjeplog had been sparked when silver was found in the area in the 1620s, and a mining industry was established there 1635–1659. It has been estimated that the amount of silver mined was 36 kilograms per year.

In August 1659, the Danes and Norwegians – who were in the Denmark–Norway union – attacked and burned down the mining village. The mining industry was then stalled for 120 years.

It was once again taken up in 1719, probably as a means of supporting the war of King Charles XII of Sweden. The mining was upheld until 1810, when the low profits, harsh climate and the long distances led to its closure. There are still remains from that time in the village Adolfström.

There are also several names in the area such as Silvervägen ("Silver Road") and Silversundet ("Silver Strait") reminding of its silver history. When a Sami museum was built in the town of Arjeplog in 1965, it was appropriately named Silvermuseet ("The Silver Museum"). It is filled with Sami photos and artifacts.

== Geography ==
Arjeplog Municipality is Sweden's fourth largest municipality, but the fourth least populated. It is located by the shores of Lake Hornavan, Sweden's deepest lake and one of its largest. The municipality is popular because of the scenery of Lake Hornavan, but also of its other untouched nature.

Arjeplog Municipality consists of a terrain dominated by the Scandinavian Mountains and many water areas. It boasts an unparalleled 8,000 lakes and streams, with three main rivers, namely Pite River, Skellefte River and Lais River. Skellefte River attaches south from Lake Hornavan and extends southeast to Skellefteå and the Gulf of Bothnia on the east coast.

About 80 kilometres north of the town Arjeplog one finds the national parks Padjelanta and Sarek, both being situated in the western parts of Jokkmokk Municipality.

Arjeplog Municipality also has 13 nature reserves, mostly mountain moorland, where endangered plants grow. Mountain Galtispouda, with a height of 800 metres, is a popular place of outlook, a nature reserve, and in the winter a popular place for skiing.

=== Localities ===
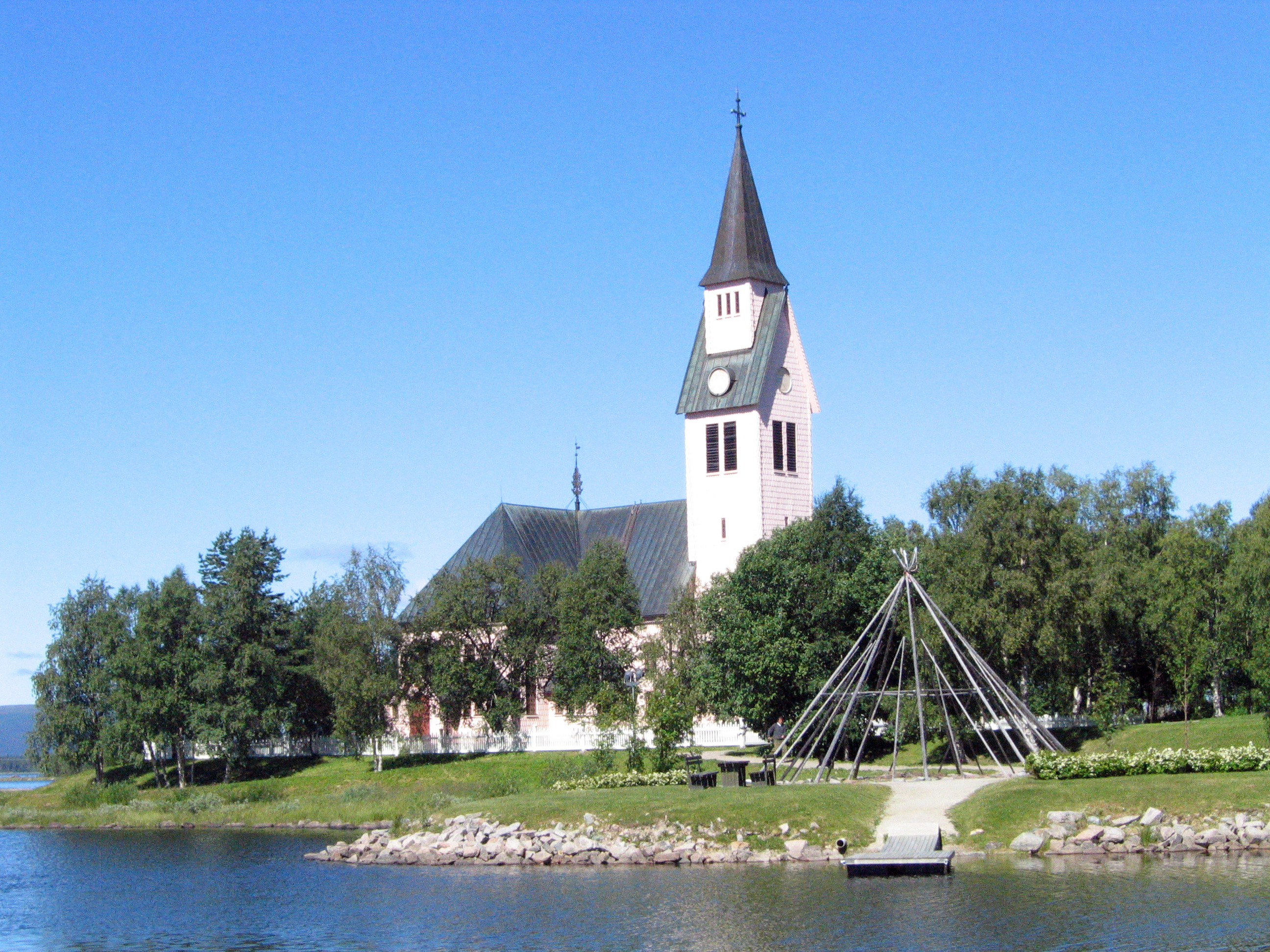
Arjeplog church

There is only one locality (or urban area) in Arjeplog Municipality:

| # | Locality | Population |
|---|---|---|
| 1 | Arjeplog | 1,947 |

== Demographics ==
This is a demographic table based on Arjeplog Municipality's electoral districts in the 2022 Swedish general election sourced from SVT's election platform, in turn taken from SCB official statistics.

In total there were 2,705 inhabitants, with 2,126 Swedish citizens of voting age. 53.6% voted for the left coalition and 45.6% for the right coalition. The slight difference of results between the sole Arjeplog district and overall results was because of postal votes being counted separately. Indicators are in percentage points except population totals and income.

| Location | Residents | Citizen adults | Left vote | Right vote | Employed | Swedish parents | Foreign heritage | Income SEK | Degree |
| Location | | | % | % | | | | | |
|---|---|---|---|---|---|---|---|---|---|
| Arjeplog | 2,705 | 2,126 | 53.5 | 45.9 | 83 | 88 | 12 | 23,823 | 27 |
Source: SVT

== Elections ==
=== Riksdag ===
These are the results of the elections to the Riksdag since the 1972 municipal reform. Norrbotten Party also contested the 1994 election but due to the party's small size at a nationwide level SCB did not publish the party's results at a municipal level. The same applies to the Sweden Democrats between 1988 and 1998. "Turnout" denotes the percentage of eligible voters casting any ballots, whereas "Votes" denotes the number of actual valid ballots cast.

| Year | Turnout | Votes | V | S | MP | C | L | KD | M | SD | ND | NP/SP |
|---|---|---|---|---|---|---|---|---|---|---|---|---|
| 1973 | 86.6 | 2,706 | 22.9 | 45.9 | 0.0 | 19.6 | 5.1 | 2.3 | 3.7 | 0.0 | 0.0 | 0.0 |
| 1976 | 87.4 | 2,751 | 17.1 | 48.2 | 0.0 | 20.9 | 6.5 | 2.1 | 4.5 | 0.0 | 0.0 | 0.0 |
| 1979 | 86.6 | 2,717 | 17.1 | 48.1 | 0.0 | 15.8 | 7.1 | 2.3 | 7.5 | 0.0 | 0.0 | 0.0 |
| 1982 | 86.2 | 2,668 | 15.6 | 51.1 | 1.0 | 15.5 | 3.0 | 2.8 | 10.1 | 0.0 | 0.0 | 0.0 |
| 1985 | 83.9 | 2,613 | 16.1 | 50.1 | 0.8 | 14.3 | 9.0 | 0.0 | 9.4 | 0.0 | 0.0 | 0.0 |
| 1988 | 82.4 | 2,449 | 16.6 | 48.9 | 5.0 | 12.7 | 8.1 | 2.8 | 5.4 | 0.0 | 0.0 | 0.0 |
| 1991 | 82.6 | 2,383 | 11.0 | 48.9 | 2.2 | 11.8 | 5.6 | 5.5 | 9.8 | 0.0 | 5.1 | 0.0 |
| 1994 | 83.6 | 2,361 | 13.8 | 55.9 | 5.0 | 8.3 | 3.9 | 2.9 | 8.7 | 0.0 | 0.2 | 0.0 |
| 1998 | 79.0 | 2,166 | 24.6 | 44.2 | 3.9 | 6.0 | 2.7 | 7.6 | 7.5 | 0.0 | 0.0 | 0.0 |
| 2002 | 77.0 | 1,981 | 14.8 | 45.7 | 4.5 | 9.2 | 5.4 | 5.6 | 3.8 | 0.0 | 0.0 | 10.2 |
| 2006 | 78.3 | 1,955 | 14.5 | 45.0 | 3.2 | 10.3 | 6.1 | 4.8 | 10.7 | 1.7 | 0.0 | 1.7 |
| 2010 | 79.4 | 1,973 | 11.7 | 46.7 | 4.6 | 5.8 | 5.9 | 4.9 | 14.5 | 4.9 | 0.0 | 0.0 |
| 2014 | 80.3 | 1,851 | 12.0 | 44.2 | 3.5 | 6.9 | 3.3 | 3.5 | 9.8 | 14.8 | 0.0 | 0.0 |

Blocs

This lists the relative strength of the socialist and centre-right blocs since 1973, but parties not elected to the Riksdag are inserted as "other", including the Sweden Democrats results from 1988 to 2006, but also the Christian Democrats pre-1991 and the Greens in 1982, 1985 and 1991. The sources are identical to the table above. The coalition or government mandate marked in bold formed the government after the election. New Democracy got elected in 1991 but are still listed as "other" due to the short lifespan of the party.

| Year | Turnout | Votes | Left | Right | SD | Other | Elected |
|---|---|---|---|---|---|---|---|
| 1973 | 86.6 | 2,706 | **68.8** | 28.4 | 0.0 | 2.8 | 97.2 |
| 1976 | 87.4 | 2,751 | 65.3 | **31.9** | 0.0 | 2.8 | 97.2 |
| 1979 | 86.6 | 2,717 | 65.2 | **30.4** | 0.0 | 4.4 | 95.6 |
| 1982 | 86.2 | 2,668 | **66.7** | 28.6 | 0.0 | 4.7 | 95.3 |
| 1985 | 83.9 | 2,613 | **66.2** | 32.7 | 0.0 | 1.0 | 99.0 |
| 1988 | 82.4 | 2,449 | **70.5** | 26.2 | 0.0 | 3.3 | 96.7 |
| 1991 | 82.6 | 2,383 | 59.9 | **32.7** | 0.0 | 7.4 | 97.7 |
| 1994 | 83.6 | 2,361 | **74.7** | 23.8 | 0.0 | 1.5 | 98.5 |
| 1998 | 79.0 | 2,166 | **72.7** | 23.8 | 0.0 | 3.5 | 96.5 |
| 2002 | 77.0 | 1,981 | **65.0** | 24.0 | 0.0 | 11.0 | 89.0 |
| 2006 | 78.3 | 1,955 | 62.7 | **31.9** | 0.0 | 5.4 | 94.6 |
| 2010 | 79.4 | 1,973 | 63.0 | **31.1** | 4.9 | 1.0 | 99.0 |
| 2014 | 80.3 | 1,851 | **59.7** | 23.5 | 14.8 | 2.0 | 98.0 |

== Sister city ==
Arjeplog Municipality has two sister cities:

- Umba, Russia
- Salla, Finland

== See also ==
- Nasa silver mine
- Hornavanskolan
