= Smygehuk Lighthouse =

Lighthouse in Trelleborg, Sweden

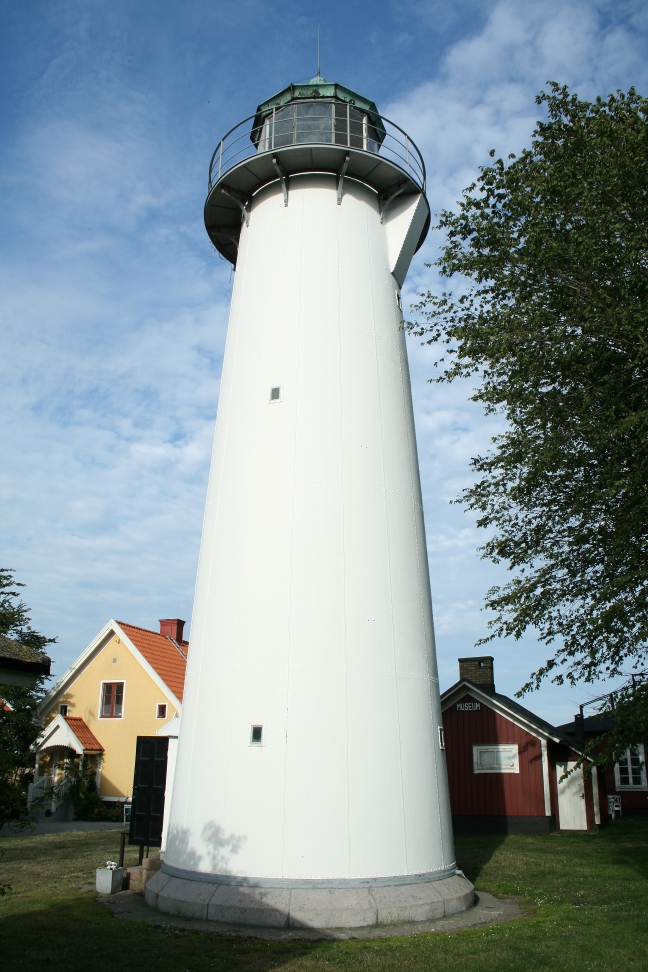
- Location: Smygehuk; Scania; Sweden
- Coordinates: 55°20′18.6″N 13°21′10.0″E

Tower
- Constructed: 1883
- Construction: cast iron tower
- Height: 17 m (56 ft)
- Shape: cylindrical tower with balcony and lantern
- Markings: white tower, greenish metallic lantern dome
- Power source: kerosene, electricity
- Operator: Swedish Maritime Administration (Sjöfartsverket)
- Fog signal: no

Light
- First lit: 15 October 1883
- Deactivated: 1975-2001
- Focal height: 19.6 m (64 ft)
- Lens: third order Fresnel lens
- Intensity: 60 watt
- Range: 14 nautical miles (26 km; 16 mi)
- Characteristic: Fl (2+1) W 20s.
- Sweden no.: SV-6576

Smygehuk Lighthouse (Swedish: Smygehuks fyr) is a lighthouse in Trelleborg Municipality in Sweden. It is situated approximately 1.5 kilometres (0.93 mi) west of Smygehamn, and is 17 metres (56 ft) high and constructed of iron. It was completed in 1883, and taken out of service in 1975 in favor of the offshore Kullagrundet Lighthouse. Following an initiative by Trelleborg Municipality, among others, it was relit in April 2001. Smygehuk Lighthouse is located at Smygehuk, near the southernmost tip of Sweden and the Scandinavian Peninsula.

== History ==
The lighthouse originally was lit by paraffin oil, but this was soon replaced by electricity, and the lighthouse was fitted with a 1,000-watt Incandescent light bulb. The luminous intensity was 180,000 Hefner candles. The rotating third-order lens spread the beams of light in the correct pattern "every fifth second a flash alternating between red and white". Today, the lens no longer rotates, and the lamp is only 60 watts. Despite this low wattage, it still reaches about 15 kilometers out over the sea, providing guidance mainly for tourists and fishing boats.

The first lighthouse-keeper, Elis Andersson, lived in the plastered house. His lookout and assistant lived in the wooden house. In 1985, this was converted into a hostel — Sweden's southernmost tourist accommodation. The site has also been a weather station, which made its last report in April 1984. An old housing for measuring equipment and a rain gauge can be seen to the east of the lighthouse.

== See also ==
- List of lighthouses and lightvessels in Sweden
