= Geography of Sweden =

- Continent: Europe
- Region: Scandinavia
- Coordinates: 62°00′N 15°00′E
- Area: Ranked 55th
  - Total: 450,295 km^{2} (173,860 sq mi)
  - Land: 91.31%
  - Water: 8.69%
- Coastline: 3,218 km (2,000 mi)
- Borders: Norway (non-EU) 1,666 km (1,035 mi); Finland 545 km (339 mi); Denmark 118 km (73 mi); Latvia 100 km (62 mi); Poland 100 km (62 mi); Russia (non-EU)(EEZ)(Kaliningrad) 15 km (9.3 mi); Lithuania 18 km (11 mi); Germany 29 km (18 mi); Estonia 30 km (19 mi)
- Highest point: Kebnekaise 2,097 m (6,880 ft)
- Lowest point: Kristianstad −2.41 m (−7.9 ft)
- Longest river: Klarälven-Göta älv 720 km (450 mi)
- Largest lake: Vänern 5,648 km^{2} (2,181 sq mi)
- Climate: Temperate to subarctic
- Terrain: Flat lowlands, mountains
- Natural resources: Iron, copper, lead, zinc, gold, silver, tungsten, uranium, arsenic, feldspar, timber, hydropower
- Natural hazards: Ice floe
- Environmental issues: Acid rains, eutrophication
- Exclusive economic zone: 160,885 km^{2} (62,118 mi^{2})

Sweden is a country in Northern Europe on the Scandinavian Peninsula. It borders Norway to the west (which is one of Sweden’s non-EU neighbours); Finland to the northeast; and the Baltic Sea and Gulf of Bothnia to the south and east. At 450,295 km^{2} (173,860 sq mi), Sweden is the largest country in Northern Europe, the fifth largest in Europe, and the 55th largest country in the world.

Sweden has a 3,572 km (2,220 mi) long coastline on its east, and the Scandinavian mountain chain (Skanderna) on its western border, separating it from Norway. It has maritime borders with Denmark, Germany, Poland, Russia (another non-EU neighbour) Lithuania, Latvia and Estonia, and it is also linked to Denmark (southwest) by the Öresund bridge. It has an Exclusive Economic Zone of 160,885 km^{2} (62,118 mi^{2}).

== Terrain ==
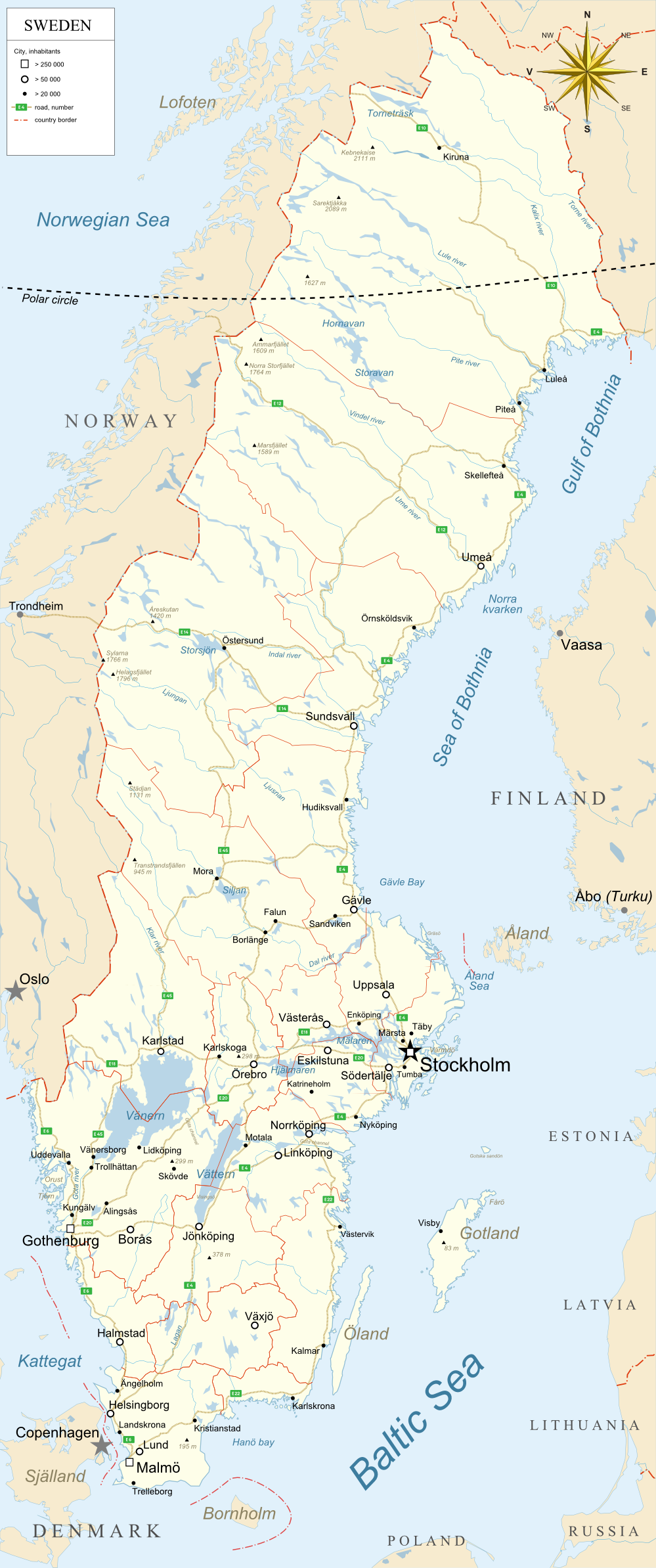
Map of Sweden

Much of Sweden is heavily forested, with 69% of the country being forest and woodland, while farmland constitutes only 8% of land use. Sweden consists of 39,960 km^{2} of water area, constituting around 95,700 lakes. (Note: The great number of lakes in southern Sweden could according to Alfred Gabriel Nathorst be indebted to the creation of basins due to the stripping of an irregular mantle of weathered rock by glacier erosion.) The lakes are sometimes used for water power plants, especially the large northern rivers and lakes.

Most of northern and western central Sweden consists of vast tracts of hilly and mountainous land called the Norrland terrain. From the south the transition to the Norrland terrain is not only seen in the relief but also in the wide and contiguous boreal forests that extend north of it with till and peat being the overwhelmingly most common soil types.

South of the Norrland terrain lies the Central Swedish lowland which forms a broad east-west trending belt from Gothenburg to Stockholm. This is the traditional heartland of Sweden due to its large population and agricultural resources. The region forms a belt of fertile soils suitable for agriculture that interrupts the forested and till-coated lands to the north and south. Before the expansion of agriculture, these fertile soils were covered by a broad-leaved tree forest where maples, oaks, ashes, small-leaved lime and common hazel grew. The Central Swedish lowland does however also contain soils of poor quality, particularly in hills where Scots pine and Norway spruce grow on top of thin till soils. Agriculture aside, the region benefits also from the proximity of hydropower, forest and bergslagen's mineral resources. Sweden's four largest lakes, Vänern, Vättern, Mälaren and Hjälmaren, lie within the lowlands.

To the south of the Central Swedish lowland lies the South Swedish highlands which except for a lack of deep valleys is similar to the Norrland terrain found further north in Sweden. The highest point of the highlands lies at 377 m. Poor soil conditions have posed significant difficulties for agriculture in the highlands, meaning that over time small industries became relatively important in local economies.

Southernmost Sweden contains a varied landscape with both plains and hilly terrain. A characteristic chain of elongated hills runs across Scania from northwest to southeast. These hills are horsts located along the Tornquist Zone. Some of the horsts are Hallandsåsen, Römelåsen and Söderåsen. The plains of Scania and Halland make up 10% of Sweden's cultivated lands and are the country's main agricultural landscape. Productivity is high relative to the rest of Sweden and more akin to that of more southern European countries. The natural vegetation is made up of broadleaf forest although conifer plantations are common. Southern Sweden has Sweden's greatest animal and plant diversity.

The two largest islands are Gotland and Öland in the southeast. They differ from the rest of Sweden by being made up of limestone and marl with an alvar vegetation adapted to the island's calcareous soils. Gotland and Öland have landforms that are rare or absent in mainland Sweden. These include active cliffs seen in segments of their western coasts, sea stacks called rauks and large cave systems.

== Political divisions ==
=== Provinces ===
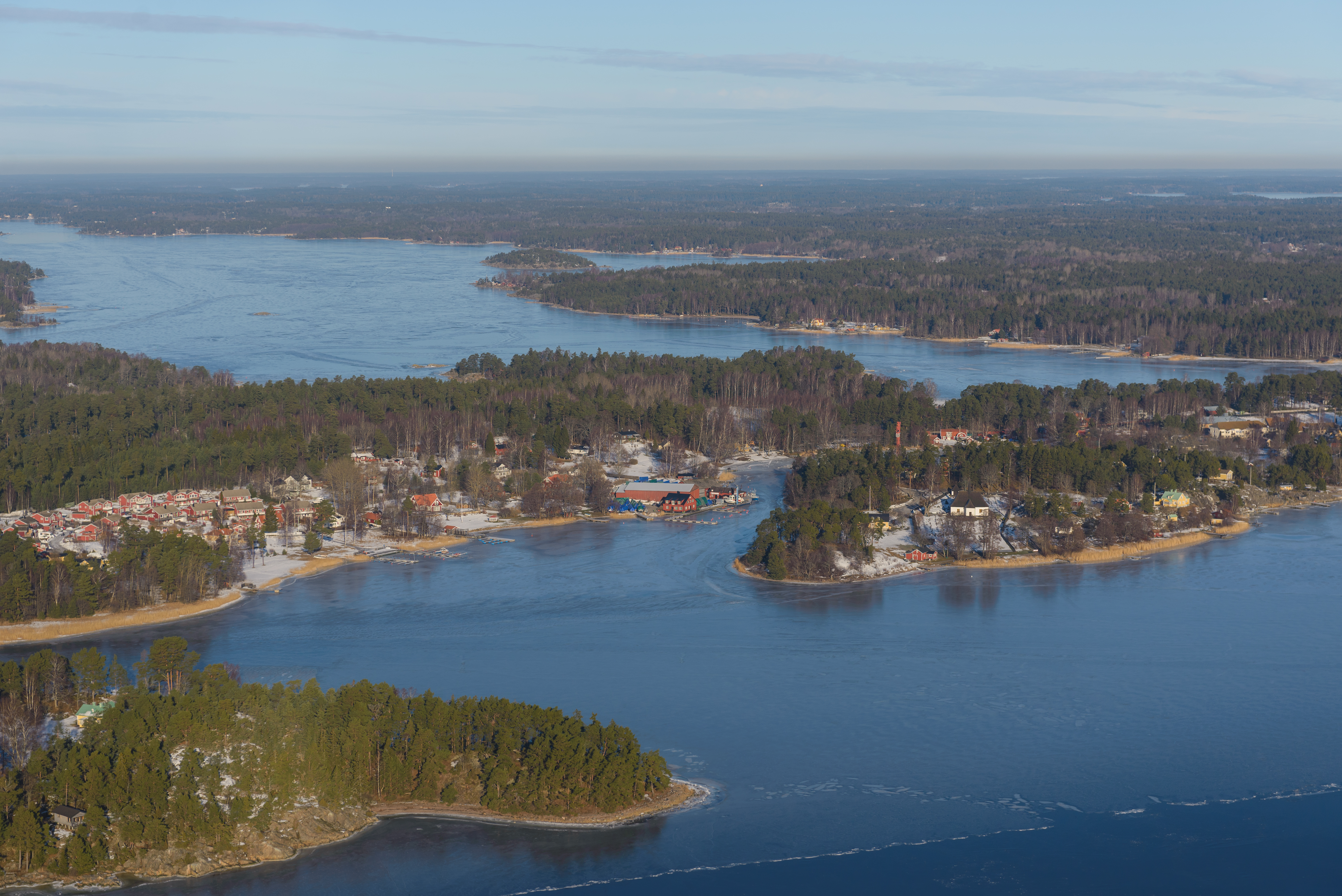
Uppland province

Sweden has 25 provinces or landskap ("landscapes"), based on culture, geography and history: Bohuslän, Blekinge, Dalarna, Dalsland, Gotland, Gästrikland, Halland, Hälsingland, Härjedalen, Jämtland, Lapland, Medelpad, Norrbotten, Närke, Skåne, Småland, Södermanland, Uppland, Värmland, Västmanland, Västerbotten, Västergötland, Ångermanland, Öland and Östergötland.

While these provinces serve no political or administrative purpose, they play an important role for people's self-identification. The provinces are usually grouped together in three large lands (landsdelar): the northern Norrland, the central Svealand and southern Götaland. The sparsely populated Norrland encompasses almost 60% of the country.

=== Counties ===

Administratively, Sweden is divided into 21 counties, or län. In each county there is a County Administrative Board, or länsstyrelse, which is appointed by the national government.

In each county there is also a separate County Council, or region (before 1 januari 2020 called landsting), which is the municipal representation appointed by the county electorate.

- K = Blekinge County
- W = Dalarna County
- I = Gotland County
- X = Gävleborg County
- N = Halland County
- Z = Jämtland County
- F = Jönköping County
- H = Kalmar County
- G = Kronoberg County
- BD = Norrbotten County
- M = Skåne County
- AB = Stockholm County
- D = Södermanland County
- C = Uppsala County
- S = Värmland County
- AC = Västerbotten County
- Y = Västernorrland County
- U = Västmanland County
- O = Västra Götaland County
- T = Örebro County
- E = Östergötland County

The letters shown were on the vehicle registration plates until 1973.

=== Municipalities ===
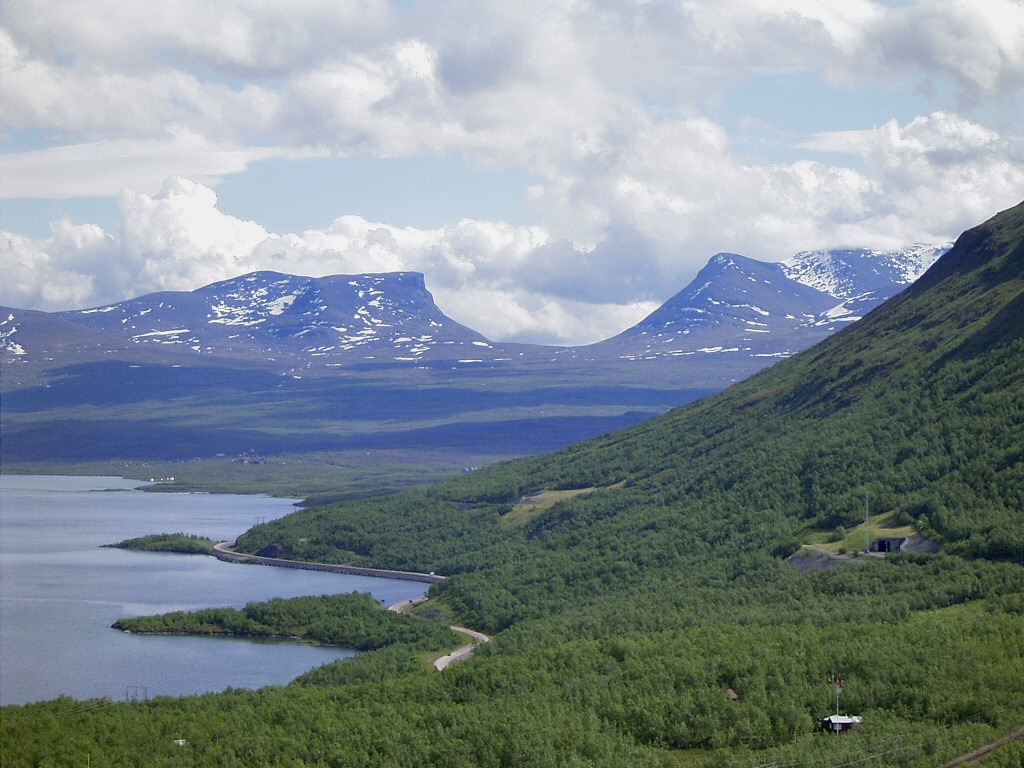
Lapporten mountain pass in Lapland

Each county is further divided into municipalities or kommuner, ranging from only one (in Gotland County) to forty-nine (in Västra Götaland County). The total number of municipalities is 290.

The northern municipalities are often large in size, but have small populations – the largest municipality is Kiruna with an area as large as the three southern provinces in Sweden (Scania, Blekinge and Halland) combined, but it only has a population of 25,000, and its density is about 1 / km^{2}.

Population density in the counties of Sweden. people/km^{2} 0–9.9 10–24.9 25–49.9 50–99.9 100–199.9 200+

== Population ==
Sweden has a population of 10 million as of January 2017. The mountainous north is considerably less populated than the southern and central regions, partly because the summer period lasts longer in the south, and this is where the more successful agricultural industries were originally established. Another historical reason is said to be the desired proximity to key trade routes and partners in continental Europe, e.g. Germany. As a result, all seven urban areas in Sweden with a population of 100,000 or more, are located in the southern half of the country.

=== Cities ===
Cities and towns in Sweden are neither political nor administrative entities, but rather localities or urban areas independent of municipal subdivisions.

The largest city by population, and the one most significant for culture and media, is the capital of Stockholm located in the east, with a population of 1,250,000. The second-largest city is Gothenburg, with a population of 510,500, located in the southwest. The third-largest is Malmö in the south, with 258,000. The largest city in the north is Umeå with 76,000 inhabitants.

== Natural resources ==
Sweden's natural resources include copper, gold, hydropower, iron ore, lead, silver, timber, uranium, and zinc.

== Environment ==
Acid rain has become an issue, as it is damaging soils and lakes and polluting the North Sea and the Baltic Sea. The HBV hydrology transport model has been used to analyze nutrient discharge to the Baltic from tributary watersheds.

=== Climate ===
Köppen climate classification types of Sweden

Most of Sweden has a temperate climate, despite its northern latitude, with largely four distinct seasons and mild temperatures throughout the year. The winter in the far south is usually weak and is manifested only through some shorter periods with snow and sub-zero temperatures, autumn may well turn into spring there, without a distinct period of winter. The northern parts of the country have a subarctic climate while the central parts have a humid continental climate. The coastal south can be defined as having either a humid continental climate using the 0 °C isotherm, or an oceanic climate using the –3 °C isotherm.

Due to the increased maritime moderation in the peninsular south, temperature differences between the coastlines of the southernmost and northernmost regions are about 2 °C (4 °F) in summer and 10 °C (18 °F) in winter. This grows further when comparing areas in the northern interior where the winter difference in the far north is about 15 °C (27 °F) throughout the country. The warmest summers usually happen in the Mälaren Valley around Stockholm due to the vast landmass shielding the middle east coast from Atlantic low-pressure systems in July compared to the south and west. Daytime highs in Sweden's municipal seats vary from 19 °C (66 °F) to 24 °C (75 °F) in July and −9 °C (16 °F) to 3 °C (37 °F) in January. The colder temperatures are influenced by the higher elevation in the northern interior. At sea level instead, the coldest average highs range from 21 °C (70 °F) to −6 °C (21 °F). As a result of the mild summers, the arctic region of Norrbotten has some of the northernmost agriculture in the world.

Sweden is much warmer and drier than other places at a similar latitude, and even somewhat farther south, mainly because of the combination of the Gulf Stream and the general west wind drift, caused by the direction of planet Earth's rotation. Continental west-coasts (to which all of Scandinavia belongs, as the westernmost part of the Eurasian continent), are notably warmer than continental east-coasts; this can also be seen by comparing e.g. the Canadian cities of Vancouver and Halifax, Nova Scotia with each other, the winter in west coast Vancouver is much milder; also, for example, central and southern Sweden has much milder winters than many parts of Russia, Canada, and the northern United States. Because of Sweden's high latitude, the length of daylight varies greatly. North of the Arctic Circle, the sun never sets for part of each summer, and it never rises for part of each winter. In the capital, Stockholm, daylight lasts for more than 18 hours in late June but only around 6 hours in late December. Sweden receives between 1,100 and 1,900 hours of sunshine annually.

The highest temperature ever recorded in Sweden was 38 °C (100 °F) in Målilla in June 1947, a record shared with Ultuna in Uppland. The coldest temperature ever recorded was −52.6 °C (−62.7 °F) in Vuoggatjålme on 2 February 1966. Temperatures expected in Sweden are heavily influenced by the large Fennoscandian landmass, as well as continental Europe and western Russia, which allows hot or cool inland air to be easily transported to Sweden. That, in turn, renders most of Sweden's southern areas having warmer summers than almost everywhere in the nearby British Isles, even matching temperatures found along the continental Atlantic coast as far south as in northern Spain. In winter, however, the same high-pressure systems sometimes put the entire country far below freezing temperatures. There is some maritime moderation from the Atlantic which renders the Swedish continental climate less severe than that of nearby Russia. Even though temperature patterns differ between north and south, the summer climate is surprisingly similar all through the entire country in spite of the large latitudinal differences. This is due to the south's being surrounded by a greater mass of water, with the wider Baltic Sea and the Atlantic air passing over lowland areas from the south-west.

Apart from the ice-free Atlantic bringing marine air into Sweden tempering winters, the mildness is further explained by prevailing low-pressure systems postponing winter, with the long nights often staying above freezing in the south of the country due to the abundant cloud cover. By the time winter finally breaks through, daylight hours rise quickly, ensuring that daytime temperatures soar quickly in spring. With the greater number of clear nights, frosts remain commonplace quite far south as late as April. The cold winters occur when low-pressure systems are weaker. An example is that the coldest ever month (January 1987) in Stockholm was also the sunniest January month on record.

The relative strength of low and high-pressure systems of marine and continental air also define the highly variable summers. When hot continental air hits the country, the long days and short nights frequently bring temperatures up to 30 °C (86 °F) or above even in coastal areas. Nights normally remain cool, especially in inland areas. Coastal areas can see so-called tropical nights above 20 °C (68 °F) occur due to the moderating sea influence during warmer summers. Summers can be cool, especially in the north of the country. Transitional seasons are normally quite extensive and the four-season climate applies to most of Sweden's territory, except in Scania where some years do not record a meteorological winter (see table below) or in the high Lapland mountains where polar microclimates exist.

On average, most of Sweden receives between 500 and 800 mm (20 and 31 in) of precipitation each year, making it considerably drier than the global average. The south-western part of the country receives more precipitation, between 1,000 and 1,200 mm (39 and 47 in), and some mountain areas in the north are estimated to receive up to 2,000 mm (79 in). Despite northerly locations, southern and central Sweden may have almost no snow in some winters. Most of Sweden is located in the rain shadow of the Scandinavian Mountains through Norway and north-west Sweden. The blocking of cool and wet air in summer, as well as the greater landmass, leads to warm and dry summers far north in the country, with quite warm summers at the Bothnia Bay coast at 65 degrees latitude, which is unheard of elsewhere in the world at such northerly coastlines.

It is predicted that as the Barents Sea gets less frozen in the coming winters, becoming thus "Atlantified", additional evaporation will increase future snowfalls in Sweden and much of continental Europe.

Gothenburg

Climate chart (precipitation, max. and min. temperature)
J	F	M	A	M	J	J	A	S	O	N	D
62 1 −4	41 1 −5	50 5 −2	42 9 1	51 16 6	61 19 10	68 20 12	77 20 12	81 16 8	84 11 6	84 6 1	75 3 −3
- █ Average max. and min. temperatures in °C
- █ Precipitation totals in mm
- Source: Climatedata.eu
Imperial conversion
J	F	M	A	M	J	J	A	S	O	N	D
2.4 34 25	1.6 34 23	2 41 28	1.7 48 34	2 61 43	2.4 66 50	2.7 68 54	3 68 54	3.2 61 46	3.3 52 43	3.3 43 34	3 37 27
- █ Average max. and min. temperatures in °F
- █ Precipitation totals in inches

Kiruna

Climate chart (precipitation, max. and min. temperature)
J	F	M	A	M	J	J	A	S	O	N	D
30 −11 −21	25 −8 −22	26 −4 −18	26 0 −9	33 8 −1	48 15 5	86 18 7	73 15 5	49 10 0	47 −2 −10	41 −6 −13	34 −8 −19
- █ Average max. and min. temperatures in °C
- █ Precipitation totals in mm
- Source: SMHI.se
Imperial conversion
J	F	M	A	M	J	J	A	S	O	N	D
1.2 12 −6	1 18 −8	1 25 0	1 32 16	1.3 46 30	1.9 59 41	3.4 64 45	2.9 59 41	1.9 50 32	1.9 28 14	1.6 21 9	1.3 18 −2
- █ Average max. and min. temperatures in °F
- █ Precipitation totals in inches

Nyköping

Climate chart (precipitation, max. and min. temperature)
J	F	M	A	M	J	J	A	S	O	N	D
40 0 −6	25 0 −6	25 3 −4	30 8 0	30 15 5	45 20 10	60 22 13	50 22 11	55 15 7	45 11 4	50 5 −1	45 1 −5
- █ Average max. and min. temperatures in °C
- █ Precipitation totals in mm
- Source: SMHI.se
Imperial conversion
J	F	M	A	M	J	J	A	S	O	N	D
1.6 32 21	1 32 21	1 37 25	1.2 46 32	1.2 59 41	1.8 68 50	2.4 72 55	2 72 52	2.2 59 45	1.8 52 39	2 41 30	1.8 34 23
- █ Average max. and min. temperatures in °F
- █ Precipitation totals in inches

Stockholm

Climate chart (precipitation, max. and min. temperature)
J	F	M	A	M	J	J	A	S	O	N	D
39 −1 −5	27 −1 −5	26 3 −3	30 9 1	30 16 6	45 21 11	72 22 13	66 20 13	55 15 9	50 10 5	53 5 1	46 1 −3
- █ Average max. and min. temperatures in °C
- █ Precipitation totals in mm
- Source: HKO
Imperial conversion
J	F	M	A	M	J	J	A	S	O	N	D
1.5 30 23	1.1 30 23	1 37 27	1.2 48 34	1.2 61 43	1.8 70 52	2.8 72 55	2.6 68 55	2.2 59 48	2 50 41	2.1 41 34	1.8 34 27
- █ Average max. and min. temperatures in °F
- █ Precipitation totals in inches

Swedish Meteorological Institute, SMHI's monthly average temperatures of some of their weather stations – for the latest scientific full prefixed thirty-year period 1961–1990 Next will be presented in year 2020. The weather stations are sorted from south towards north by their numbers.

stn.nr.	station	Jan	Feb	Mar	Apr	May	Jun	Jul	Aug	Sep	Oct	Nov	Dec	Annual
5337	Malmö	0.1	0.0	2.2	6.4	11.6	15.8	17.1	16.8	13.6	9.8	5.3	1.9	8.4
6203	Helsingborg	0.6	−0.1	2.0	6.0	11.2	15.3	16.7	16.6	13.6	9.9	5.2	1.8	8.3
6451	Växjö	−2.8	−2.8	0.0	4.7	10.2	14.3	15.3	14.9	11.2	7.0	2.3	−1.2	6.1
7839	Visby	−0.5	−1.2	0.7	4.1	9.5	14.0	16.4	16.0	12.5	8.6	4.3	1.2	7.1
7447	Jönköping	−2.6	−2.7	0.3	4.7	10.0	14.5	15.9	15.0	11.3	7.5	2.8	−0.7	6.3
7263	Gothenburg	−0.9	−0.9	2.0	6.0	11.6	15.5	16.6	16.2	12.8	9.1	4.4	1.0	7.8
8323	Skövde	−2.8	−2.9	0.0	4.6	10.6	15.0	16.2	15.2	11.1	7.1	2.2	−1.1	6.3
8634	Norrköping	−3.0	−3.2	0.0	4.5	10.4	15.1	16.6	15.5	11.3	7.2	2.2	−1.4	6.3
9516	Örebro	−4.0	−4.0	−0.5	4.3	10.7	15.3	16.5	15.3	10.9	6.6	1.3	−2.4	5.8
9720	Stockholm Bromma	−3.5	−3.7	−0.5	4.3	10.4	15.2	16.8	15.8	11.4	7.0	2.0	−1.8	6.1
9739	Stockholm Arlanda	−4.3	−4.6	−1.0	3.9	9.9	14.8	16.5	15.2	10.7	6.4	1.2	−2.6	5.5
10458	Mora	−7.4	−7.2	−2.4	2.5	9.1	14.1	15.4	13.5	9.3	4.9	−1.6	−6.1	3.7
10740	Gävle	−4.8	−4.5	−1.0	3.4	9.3	14.6	16.3	14.9	10.6	6.0	0.6	−3.3	5.2
12724	Sundsvall	−7.5	−6.3	−2.3	2.5	8.2	13.8	15.2	13.8	9.4	4.8	−1.5	−5.7	3.6
13410	Östersund	−8.9	−7.6	−3.5	1.3	7.6	12.5	13.9	12.7	8.2	3.8	−2.4	−6.3	2.6
14050	Umeå	−8.7	−8.3	−4.0	1.4	7.6	13.3	15.6	13.8	9.0	4.0	−2.3	−6.4	2.9
15045	Skellefteå	−10.2	−8.7	−4.2	1.2	7.6	13.6	15.7	13.5	8.5	3.2	−3.4	−7.5	2.5
16288	Luleå	−12.2	−11.0	−6.0	0.3	6.6	13.0	15.4	13.3	8.0	2.6	−4.5	−9.7	1.3
16395	Haparanda	−12.1	−11.4	−6.8	−0.5	6.1	12.8	15.4	13.2	8.0	2.5	−4.2	−9.5	1.1
16988	Jokkmokk	−17.5	−14.9	−8.6	−1.1	5.9	12.2	14.3	11.8	5.7	−0.2	−9.3	−14.6	-1.4
17897	Tarfala (a mountain peak)	−11.8	−11.3	−10.6	−7.5	−1.9	3.2	6.4	5.3	0.8	−3.9	−7.9	−10.7	-4.2
18076	Gällivare	−14.3	−12.5	−8.4	−1.9	5.0	11.0	13.0	10.7	5.6	−0.6	−8.1	−12.2	-1.1
18094	Kiruna	−13.9	−12.5	−8.7	−3.2	3.4	9.6	12.0	9.8	4.6	−1.4	−8.1	−11.9	-1.7

=== Extremes ===
Climate data for Sweden
Month	Jan	Feb	Mar	Apr	May	Jun	Jul	Aug	Sep	Oct	Nov	Dec	Year
Record high °C (°F)	11.0 (51.8)	16.2 (61.2)	20.9 (69.6)	28.8 (83.8)	32.8 (91.0)	38.0 (100.4)	38.0 (100.4)	36.2 (97.2)	31.1 (88.0)	23.2 (73.8)	16.5 (61.7)	13.2 (55.8)	38.0 (100.4)
Record low °C (°F)	−49.4 (−56.9)	−52.6 (−62.7)	−45.8 (−50.4)	−36.5 (−33.7)	−22.2 (−8.0)	−5.5 (22.1)	−4.0 (24.8)	−8.5 (16.7)	−13.1 (8.4)	−30 (−22)	−39.0 (−38.2)	−48.9 (−56.0)	−52.6 (−62.7)

== Extreme points ==
Extreme points of Sweden

The extreme points of Sweden include the coordinates that are farthest north, south, east and west in Sweden, and the ones that are at the highest and the lowest elevations in the country. Unlike Norway and Denmark, Sweden has no external territories that can be considered either inside or outside the country depending on definition, meaning that the extreme points of Sweden are unambiguous.

The latitude and longitude are expressed in decimal degree notation, in which a positive latitude value refers to the Northern Hemisphere, and a negative value refers to the Southern Hemisphere. Additionally, a negative elevation value refers to land below sea level. The coordinates used in this article are sourced from Google Earth, which makes use of the World Geodetic System (WGS) 84, a geodetic reference system.

=== Latitude and longitude ===
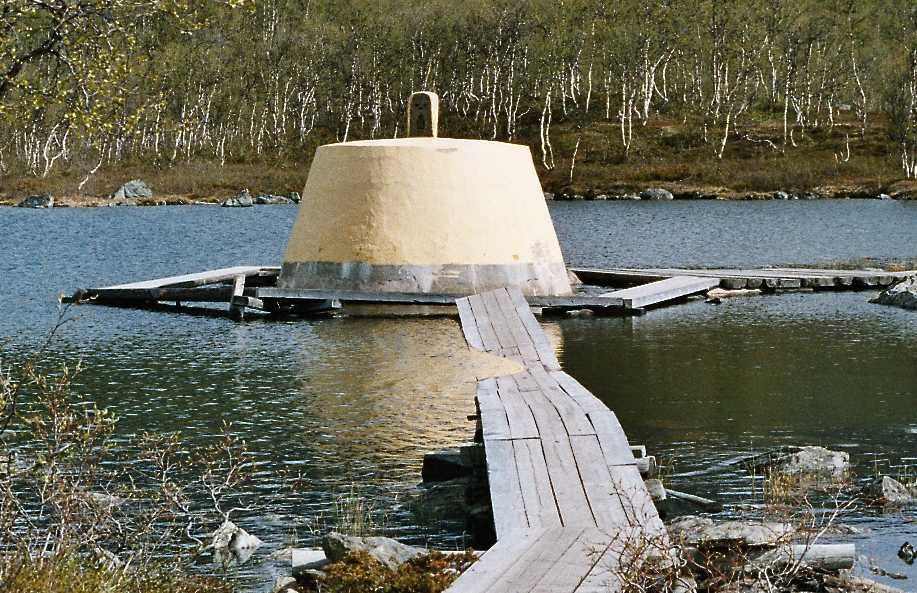
Treriksröset, Sweden's northernmost point

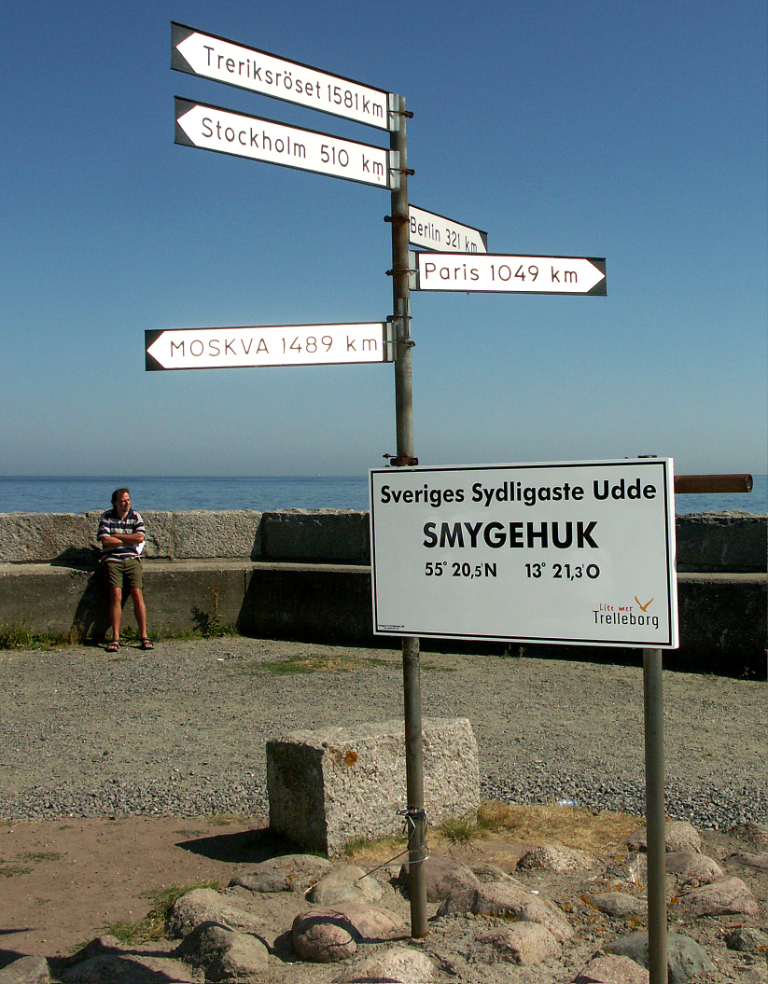
Signpost in the harbour of Smygehuk, Sweden's southernmost point

Sweden's northernmost point is Treriksröset, in the Lapland province, where the borders of Sweden, Norway, and Finland meet. The closest Swedish city to the area is Kiruna, which is Sweden's northernmost city. Sweden's southernmost point is in the harbour of the fishing village Smygehuk, near the city of Trelleborg, which borders the Baltic Sea. At the pier of the harbour, a signpost displays the exact position of the point, as well as the distance to Treriksröset, Stockholm, Berlin, Paris, and Moscow.

Sweden's westernmost point is on Stora Drammen, an islet in Skagerrak outside the coast of Bohuslän. Seabirds and harbor seals have colonies on the islet, but it is uninhabited by humans. Sweden's easternmost point is on Kataja, an islet south of Haparanda in the Bothnian Bay. The islet is divided between Sweden and Finland. The border was established in 1809, after the Finnish War, between what was previously two islets, a Swedish one called Kataja and a smaller Finnish one called Inakari. Since 1809, post-glacial rebound has caused the sea level in the region to drop relative to land level, joining the two islets. If counting the mainland only, Stensvik in Strömstad is Sweden's westernmost point, and Sundholmen in Haparanda is the easternmost point.

Heading	Location	Province	Bordering entity	Coordinates	Ref
North	Treriksröset, Kiruna	Lapland	Troms, Norway, and Lapland, Finland	69.06°N 20.548611°E	
South	Smygehuk, Trelleborg	Scania	Baltic Sea	55.336944°N 13.359444°E	
West	Stora Drammen, Strömstad	Bohuslän	Skagerrak	58.928611°N 10.9575°E	
West (mainland)	Stensvik, Strömstad	Bohuslän	Skagerrak	58.997222°N 11.113056°E	
East	Finnish border on north coast of Kataja, Haparanda	Norrbotten	Bothnian Bay	65.710833°N 24.155833°E	
East (mainland)	Sundholmen, Haparanda	Norrbotten	Torne River, and the Bothnian Bay	65.815°N 24.150556°E	

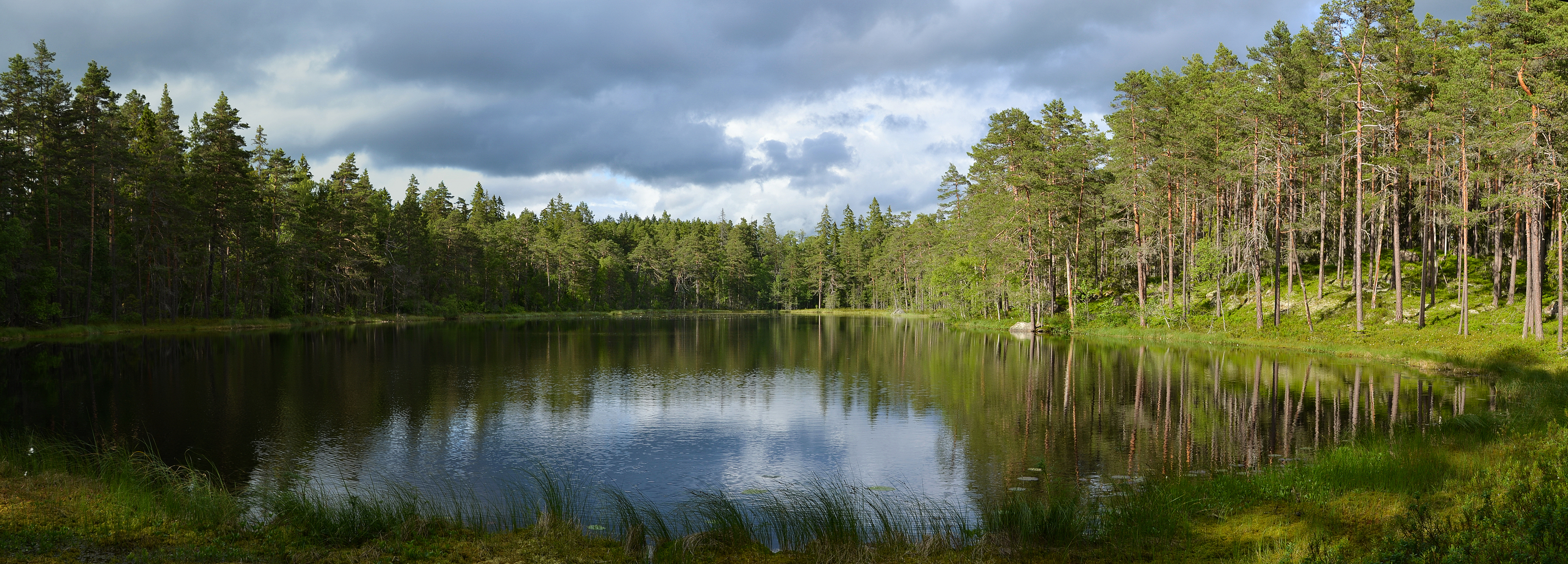
Sweden trees

=== Elevation ===
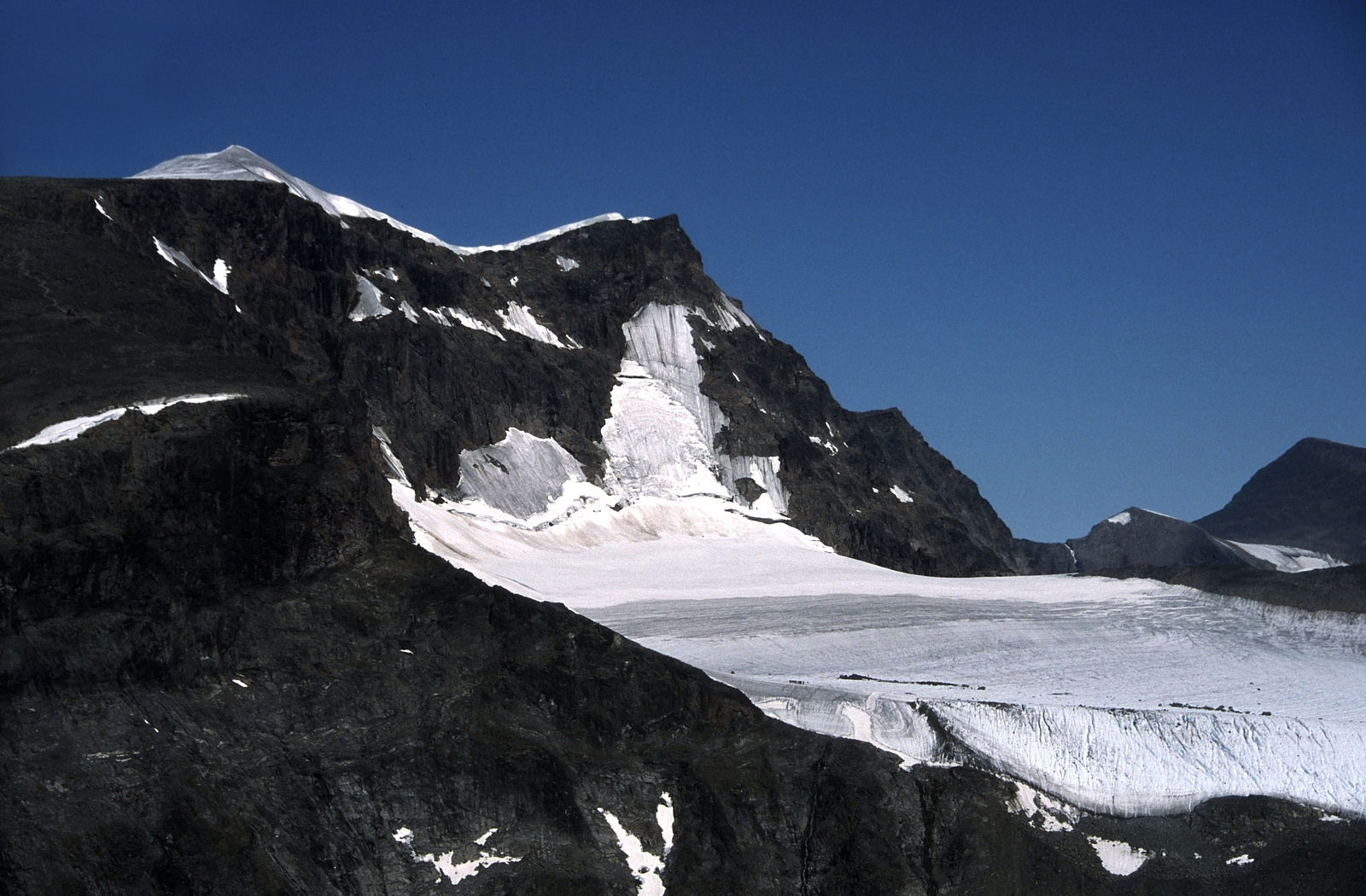
At 2,097 metres (6,880 ft), Kebnekaise is Sweden's highest point.

The highest point in Sweden is the northern peak of Kebnekaise, which stands at 2,097 metres (6,880 ft). It is in the Scandinavian Mountains chain, in the province of Lapland. The mountain has two peaks, of which the glaciated southern one was until fairly recently the highest at above 2,100 metres (6,890 ft). The top glacier on the southern peak has shrunk fast; therefore the summit is not as high as earlier. It was 2,104 metres (6,903 ft) in 2008. The northern peak, which stands at 2,097 metres (6,880 ft), is free of ice. Other points of comparable height in the vicinity of Kebnekaise include Sarektjåkka at 2,089 metres (6,854 ft), and Kaskasatjåkka at 2,076 metres (6,811 ft).

Sweden's lowest point, which is 2.41 metres (7.91 ft) below sea level, is in the Kristianstads Vattenrike Biosphere Reserve in the city of Kristianstad. The point is at the bottom of what was once Nosabyviken, a bay on the lake of Hammarsjön. The bay was drained in the 1860s by John Nun Milner, an engineer, to get more arable land for Kristianstad.

Extremity	Name	Elevation	Location	Province	Coordinates	Ref
Highest	Kebnekaise	2,097 metres (6,880 ft)	Scandinavian Mountains	Lapland	67.9°N 18.516667°E	
Lowest	Kristianstads Vattenrike Biosphere Reserve	−2.41 metres (−7.91 ft)	Kristianstad	Scania (Skåne)	56.021581°N 14.178878°E	
Deepest lake (from its surface)	Hornavan	221 metres (725 ft)	Arjeplog	Norrbotten		

=== Transport ===
Only public transport.

Heading	Airport	Railway station	Bus stop
North	Kiruna	Vassijaure (68.4290934°N 18.2606904°E)	Karesuando bus station (68.441474°N 22.4791197°E)
South	Malmö	Trelleborg (55.371783°N 13.159206°E	Smygehuk Hamnen (55.339544°N 13.359984°E)
West	Göteborg	Strömstad (58.936509°N 11.173283°E)	Strömstad Color Line terminal (58.934442°N 11.170618°E)
East	Pajala	Haparanda (65°49′41″N 24°7′53″E)	Haparanda-Tornio bus station (65°50′36″N 24°8′18″E)
Highest	Sälen, 490 m (1,610 ft)	Storlien, 592 m (1,942 ft) (63°18′57″N 12°6′2″E)	

=== Historically ===
Northernmost:

- before 1751: unclear (undefined border)
- 1751–1809: Nuorgam, Finland

Southernmost:

- Before 1648: south cape of Öland
- 1648-1815: Swedish Pomerania

Westernmost:

- Before 1658: Vinga
- 1638–1655: as a colony, New Sweden

Easternmost:

- 1617–1721: Ingria

== See also ==
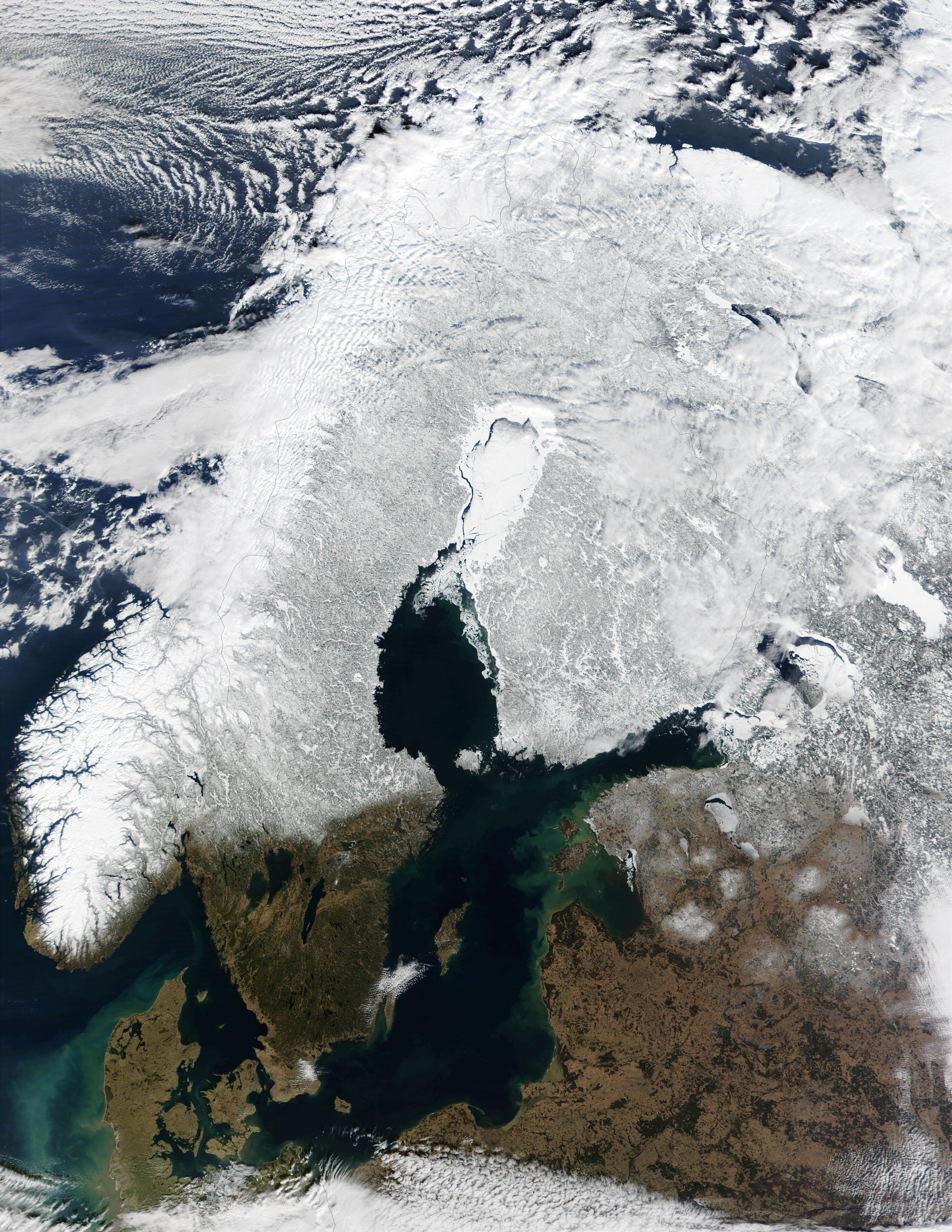
In this true-color scene on March 15, 2002, much of Sweden can be seen covered by snow.

- Geographical center of Sweden
- List of cities in Sweden
- List of islands of Sweden
- List of lakes in Sweden
- List of municipalities of Sweden
- List of national parks of Sweden
- List of rivers in Sweden
- Climate of Sweden
