= Västra Tommarp =

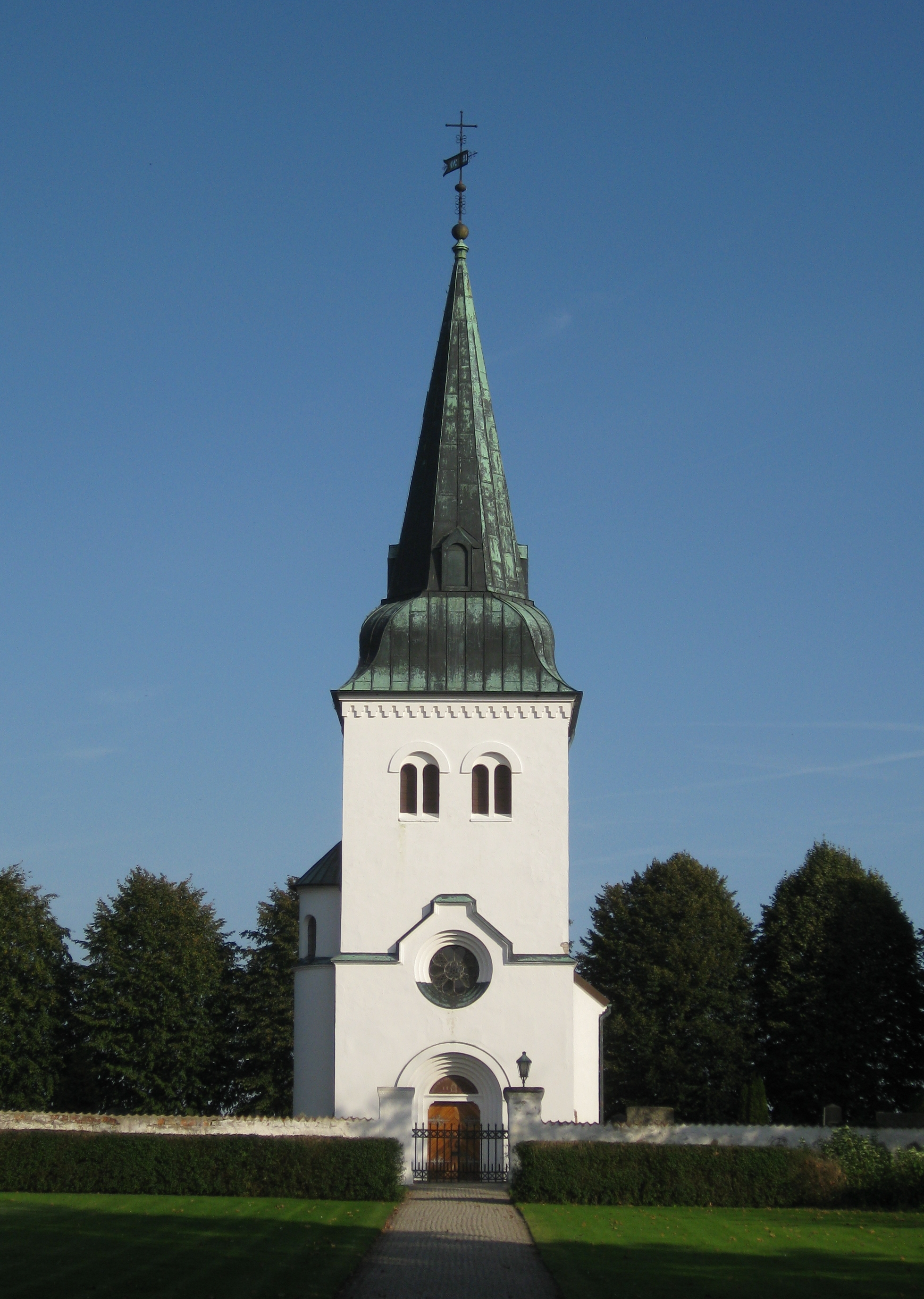
- Västra Tommarp Church

- Location within Skåne Location within Sweden
- Coordinates: 55°23′51″N 13°06′09″E
- Country: Sweden
- Province: Skåne
- County: Skåne County
- Municipality: Trelleborg Municipality

Area
  - Total: 0.20 km^{2} (0.077 sq mi)

Population (31 December 2010)
  - Total: 214
  - Density: 1,047/km^{2} (2,710/sq mi)
- Time zone: UTC+1 (CET)
  - Summer (DST): UTC+2 (CEST)

Västra Tommarp (Swedish pronunciation: [ˈvɛ̌sːtra ˈtʊ̂mːarp]) is a locality situated in Trelleborg Municipality, Skåne County, Sweden with 214 inhabitants in 2010.
