= Kurland, Sweden =

Kurland
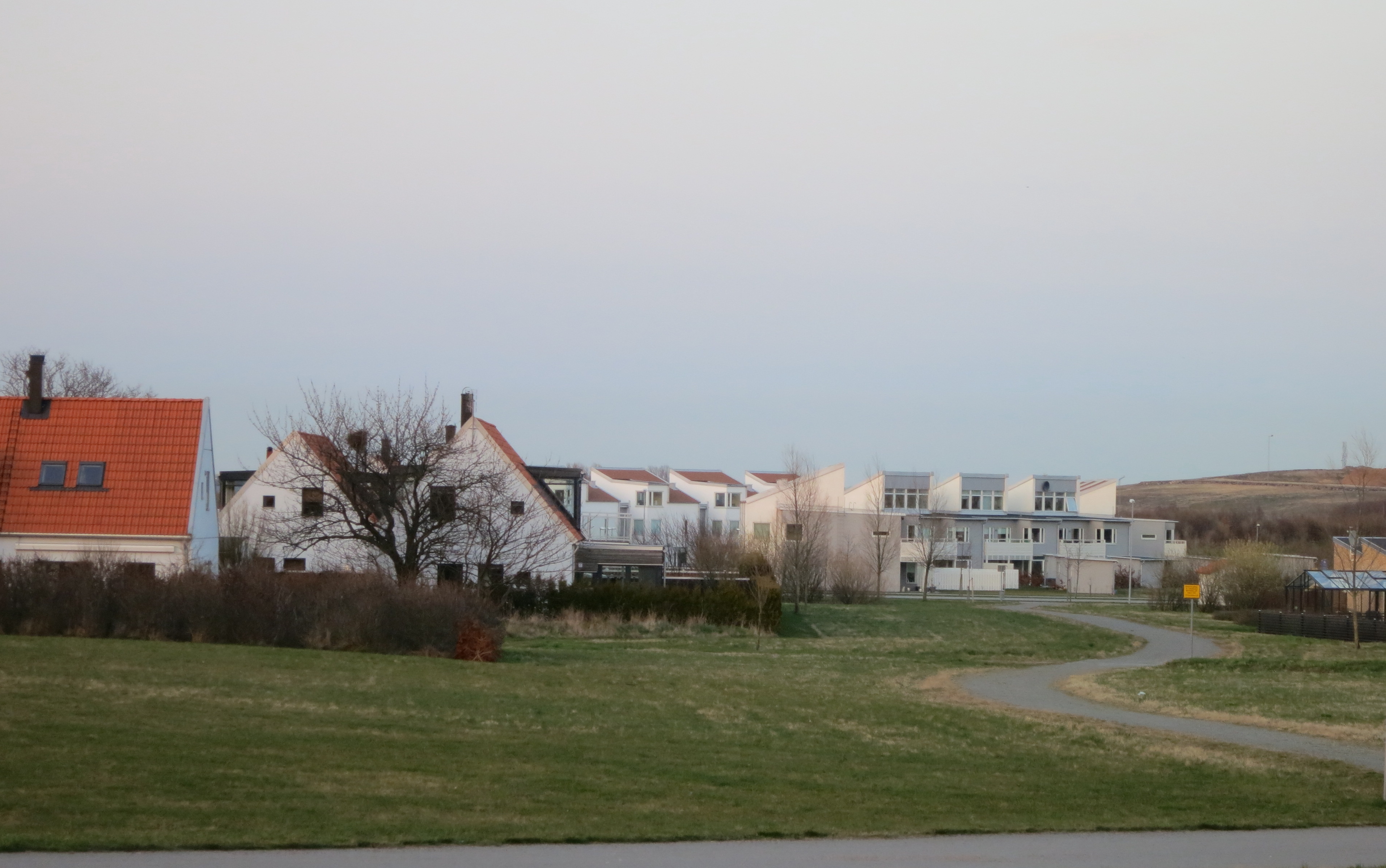
- Kurland, Stavstensudde

- Location within Skåne Location within Sweden
- Coordinates: 55°22′30″N 13°05′00″E
- Country: Sweden
- Province: Skåne
- County: Skåne County
- Municipality: Trelleborg Municipality

Area
  - Total: 0.39 km^{2} (0.15 sq mi)

Population (31 December 2010)
  - Total: 507
  - Density: 1,311/km^{2} (3,400/sq mi)
- Time zone: UTC+1 (CET)
  - Summer (DST): UTC+2 (CEST)

Kurland is a locality situated in Trelleborg Municipality, Skåne County, Sweden with 507 inhabitants in 2010.
