= Stora Drammen =

Westernmost point of Sweden

Coordinates: 58°56′N 10°58′E

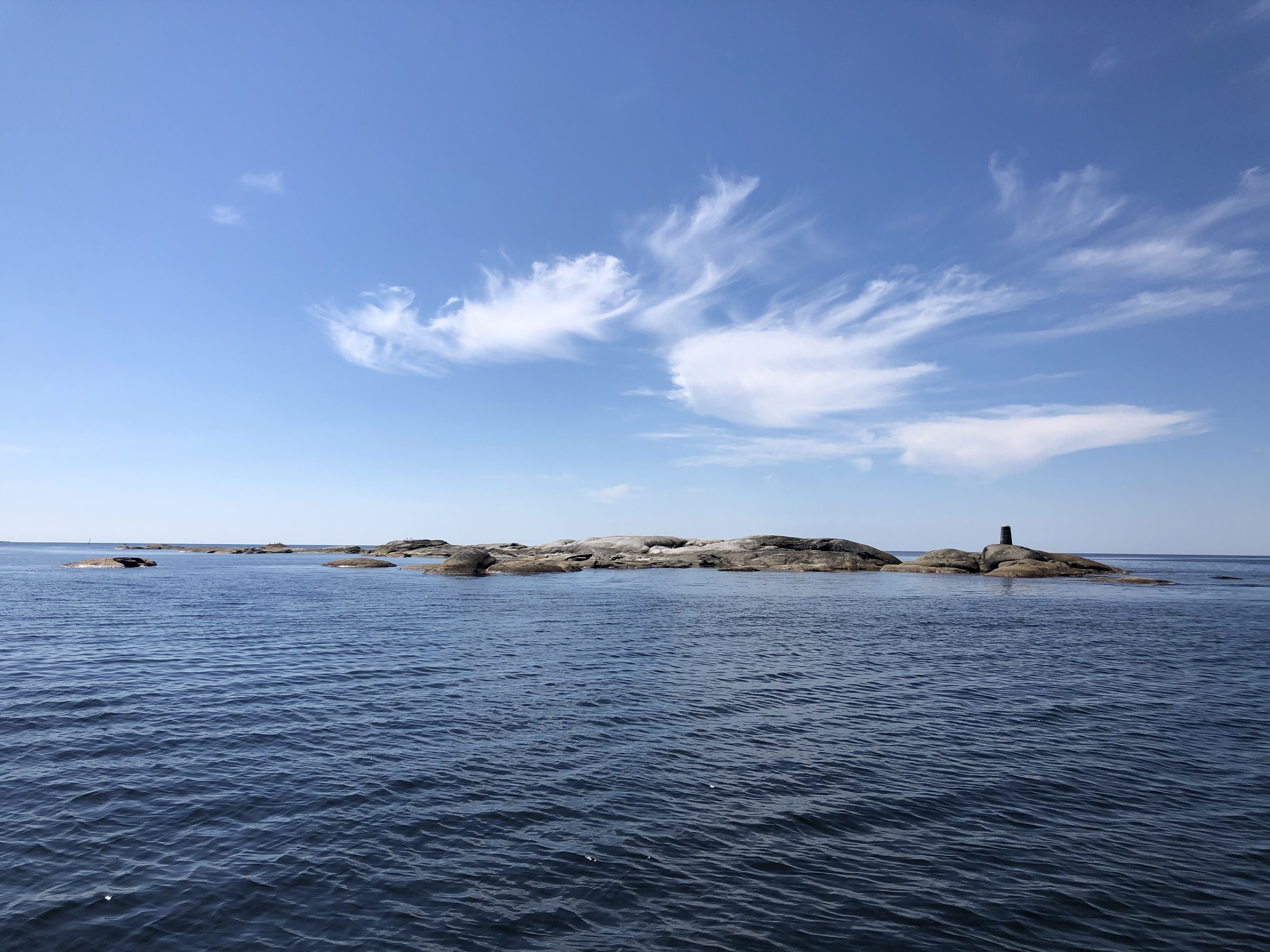
View of Stora Drammen from the northeast in June 2020

Location map of the Kosterhavet National Park and Sweden-Norway border

Stora Drammen is an uninhabited skerry situated northwest of the Bohuslän province of Götaland, Sweden. It is administratively part of Strömstad Municipality and represents the westernmost extreme point of Sweden.

== Geography ==
Stora Drammen is located within the Skagerrak Strait about 10 km from the nearest mainland city of Strömstad. It is also 2 km northwest from Nordkoster of the Koster Islands archipelago within the Kosterhavet National Park. The skerry is part of the Tjärnö district of Strömstad municipality in Västra Götaland County. Stensvik is mainland Sweden's westernmost point and located about 15 km northeast of Stora Drammen.

A sea cairn is present on the skerry to mark the Sweden-Norway border, with the border with Norway's Østfold region running only a few hundred meters north of it.

== History ==
From the early 19th century, the Grisbådarna area within the Skagerrak Strait was subjected to a maritime territorial dispute between Sweden and Norway. The Permanent Court of Arbitration in The Hague established the border on October 23, 1909 and awarded Grisbådarna to Sweden.
