= Gislövs läge och Simremarken =

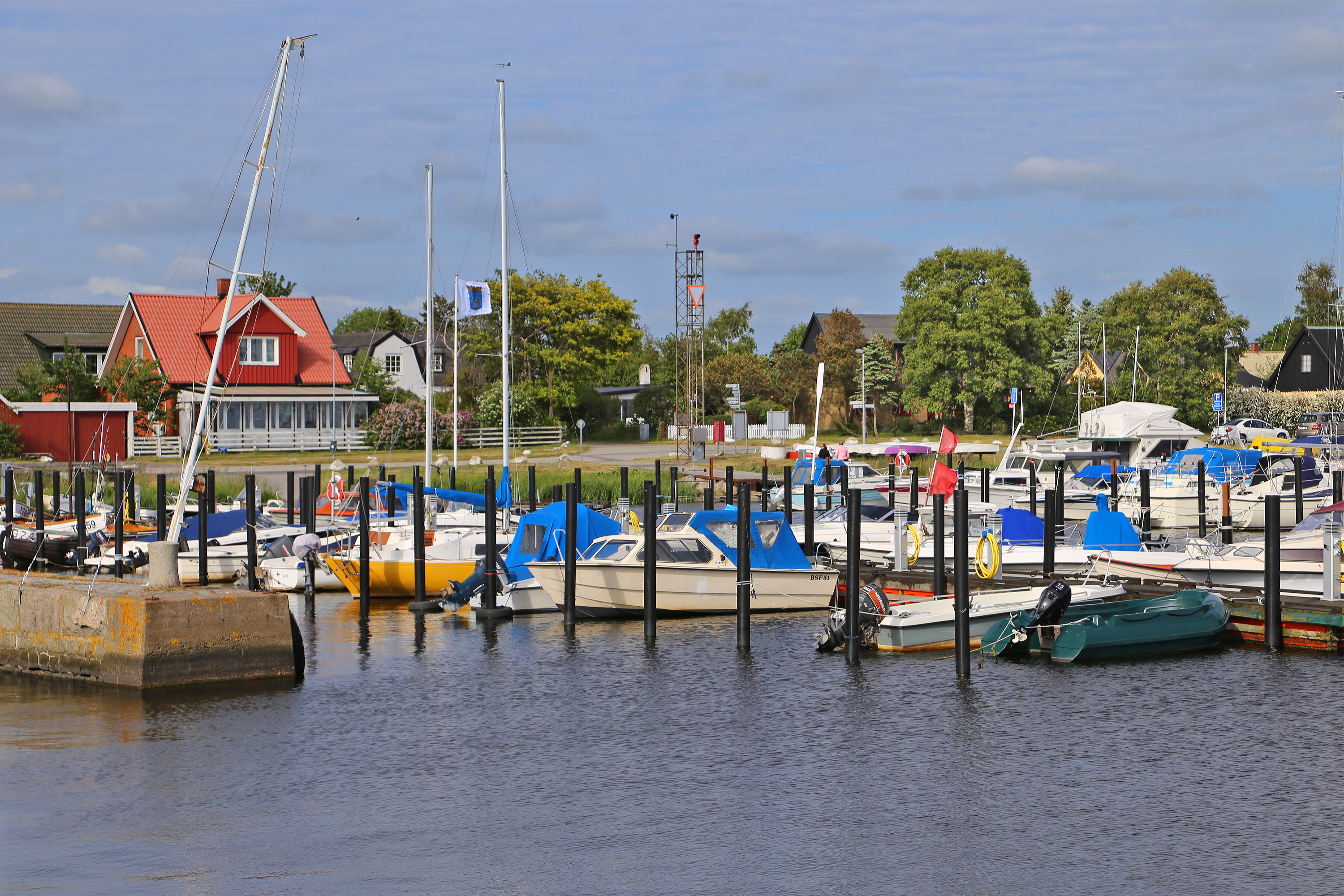

- Location within Skåne Location within Sweden
- Coordinates: 55°21′N 13°14′E
- Country: Sweden
- Province: Skåne
- County: Skåne County
- Municipality: Trelleborg Municipality

Area
  - Total: 1.47 km^{2} (0.57 sq mi)

Population (2005-12-31)
  - Total: 1,462
  - Density: 993/km^{2} (2,570/sq mi)
- Time zone: UTC+1 (CET)
  - Summer (DST): UTC+2 (CEST)

Gislövs läge och Simremarken was a village situated in Trelleborg Municipality, Skåne County, Sweden with 1,462 inhabitants in 2005.

It has since 2010 grown to be a joint part of the greater development of Trelleborg. There no longer exists an official development unit by this name.
