= Climate of Sweden =

Köppen climate classification types of Sweden using the 0 °C isotherm (1991–2020)

Köppen climate classification types of Sweden using the –3 °C isotherm (1980–2016)

The south of Sweden has a temperate climate, despite its northern latitude, with largely four distinct seasons and mild temperatures throughout the year. The winter in the far south is usually mild and is manifested only through some shorter periods with snow and sub-zero temperatures; autumn may well turn into spring there, without a distinct period of winter. The northern parts of the country have a subarctic climate while the central parts have a humid continental climate. The coastal south can be defined as having either a humid continental climate using the 0 °C isotherm or an oceanic climate using the –3 °C isotherm.

== Overview ==
Due to the increased maritime moderation in the peninsular south, summer differences between the coastlines of the southernmost and northernmost regions are about 2 °C (36 °F) in summer and 10 °C (50 °F) in winter. In the northern interior, the winter difference in the far north is about 15 °C (59 °F) throughout the country. The warmest summers usually happen in the Mälaren Valley around Stockholm due to the vast landmass shielding the middle east coast from Atlantic low-pressure systems in July compared to the south and west. Daytime highs in Sweden's municipal seats vary from 19 °C (66 °F) to 24 °C (75 °F) in July and −9 °C (16 °F) to 3 °C (37 °F) in January. The colder temperatures are influenced by the higher elevation in the northern interior. At sea level, the coldest average highs range from 21 °C (70 °F) to −6 °C (21 °F). As a result of the mild summers, the arctic region of Norrbotten has some of the northernmost agriculture in the world.

Sweden is much warmer and drier than other places at a similar latitude, and even somewhat farther south, mainly because of the combination of the Gulf Stream and the general west wind drift, caused by the direction of Earth's rotation. Continental west-coasts (to which all of Scandinavia belongs, as the westernmost part of the Eurasian continent) are notably warmer than continental east-coasts; this can also be seen by comparing the Canadian cities of Vancouver, British Columbia and Halifax, Nova Scotia, with the winter in Vancouver being much milder. Accordingly, central and southern Sweden have much milder winters than many parts of Russia, Canada, and the northern United States. Because of Sweden's high latitude, the length of daylight varies greatly. North of the Arctic Circle, the sun never sets for part of each summer, and it never rises for part of each winter. In the capital, Stockholm, daylight lasts for more than 18 hours in late June but only around 6 hours in late December. Sweden receives between 1,100 and 1,900 hours of sunshine annually.

Temperatures expected in Sweden are heavily influenced by the large Fennoscandian landmass, as well as continental Europe and western Russia, which allows hot or cool inland air to be easily transported to Sweden. That, in turn, renders most of Sweden's southern areas having warmer summers than almost everywhere in the nearby British Isles, even matching temperatures found along the continental Atlantic coast as far south as in northern Spain. In winter, however, the same high-pressure systems sometimes put the entire country far below freezing temperatures. There is some maritime moderation from the Atlantic which renders the Swedish continental climate less severe than that of nearby Russia. Even though temperature patterns differ between north and south, the summer climate is surprisingly similar all through the entire country in spite of the large latitudinal differences. This is due to the south's being surrounded by a greater mass of water, with the wider Baltic Sea and the Atlantic air passing over lowland areas from the south-west.

Apart from the ice-free Atlantic bringing marine air into Sweden tempering winters, the mildness is further explained by prevailing low-pressure systems postponing winter, with the long nights often staying above freezing in the south of the country due to the abundant cloud cover. By the time winter finally breaks through, daylight hours rise quickly, ensuring that daytime temperatures soar quickly in spring. With the greater number of clear nights, frosts remain commonplace quite far south as late as April. The cold winters occur when low-pressure systems are weaker. An example is that the coldest ever month (January 1987) in Stockholm was also the sunniest January month on record.

The relative strength of low and high-pressure systems of marine and continental air also define the highly variable summers. When hot continental air hits the country, the long days and short nights frequently bring temperatures up to 30 °C (86 °F) or above even in coastal areas. Nights normally remain cool, especially in inland areas. Coastal areas can see so-called tropical nights above 20 °C (68 °F) occur due to the moderating sea influence during warmer summers. Summers can be cool, especially in the north of the country. Transitional seasons are normally quite extensive and the four-season climate applies to most of Sweden's territory, except in Scania where some years do not record a meteorological winter (see table below) or in the high Lapland mountains where polar microclimates exist.

=== Extremes ===
The highest temperature ever recorded in Sweden was 38 °C (100 °F) in Målilla in June 1947, a record shared with Ultuna in Uppland. The coldest temperature ever recorded was −52.6 °C (−62.7 °F) in Vuoggatjålme on 2 February 1966.

=== Precipitation ===
On average, most of Sweden receives between 500 and 800 mm (20 and 31 in) of precipitation each year, making it considerably drier than the global average. The south-western part of the country receives more precipitation, between 1,000 and 1,200 mm (39 and 47 in), and some mountain areas in the north are estimated to receive up to 2,000 mm (79 in). Despite northerly locations, southern and central Sweden may have almost no snow in some winters. Most of Sweden is located in the rain shadow of the Scandinavian Mountains through Norway and north-west Sweden. The blocking of cool and wet air in summer, as well as the greater landmass, leads to warm and dry summers far north in the country, with quite warm summers at the Bothnia Bay coast at 65 degrees latitude, which is unheard of elsewhere in the world at such northerly coastlines.

== Climate change ==
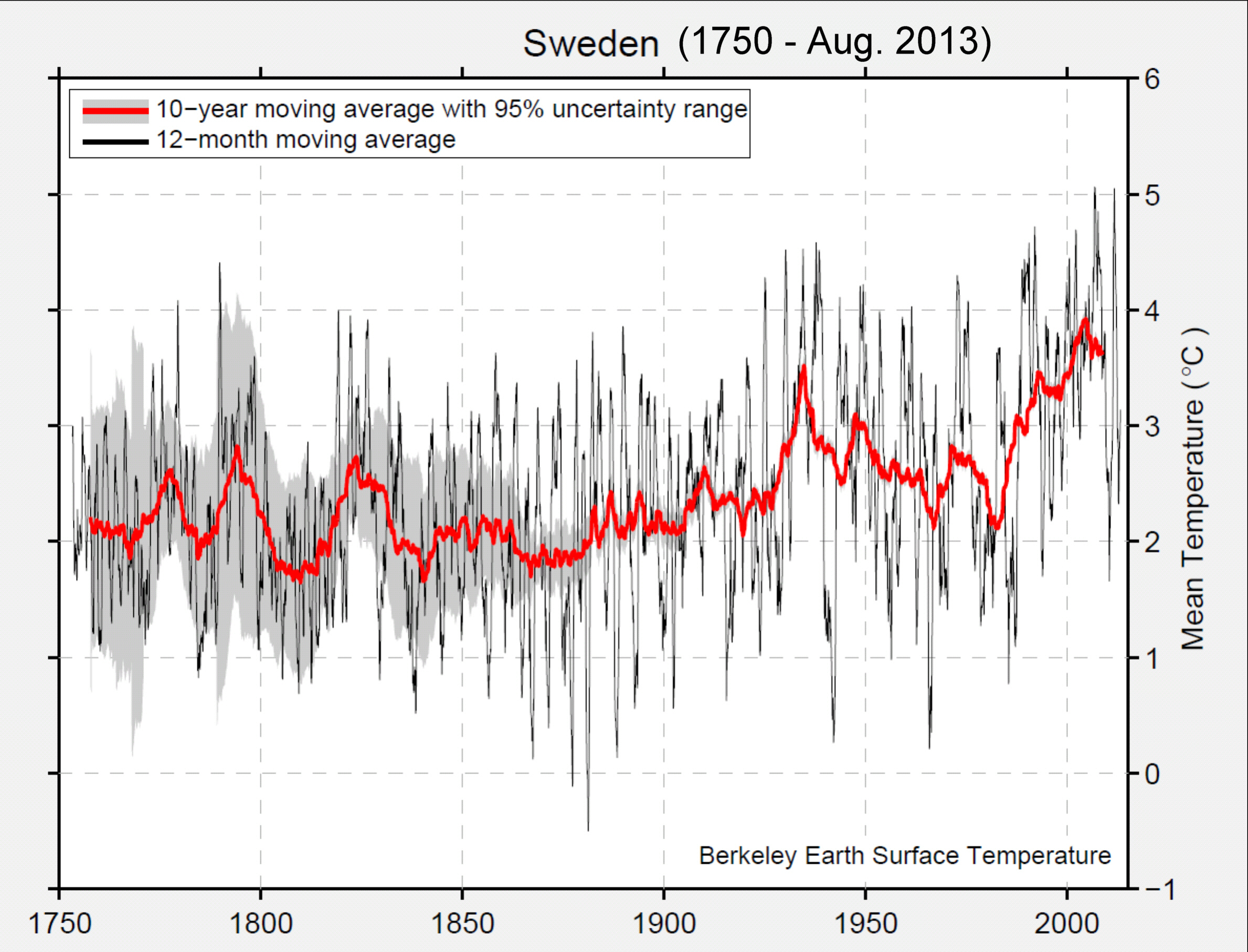
Temperature rise in Sweden's climate (1750–2013)

Climate change has received significant scientific, public and political attention in Sweden. In 1896, Swedish chemist Svante Arrhenius was the first scientist to quantify global heating. Sweden has a high energy consumption per capita, but reducing the dependency on fossil energy has been on the agenda of cabinets of the Governments of Sweden since the 1970s oil crises. In 2014 and 2016, Sweden was ranked #1 in the Global Green Economy Index (GGEI), because the Swedish economy produces relatively low emissions. Sweden has had one of the highest usages of biofuel in Europe and aims at prohibiting new sales of fossil-cars, including hybrid cars, by 2035, and for an energy supply system with zero net atmospheric greenhouse gas emissions by 2045.

Since the end of the 19th century, the average annual temperature has risen by almost two degrees Celsius, compared to global warming of just over one degree. Sweden's winter temperature is predicted to further increase by as much as 7 °C (13 °F) by 2100 in a worst-case scenario. This will increase the percentage of precipitation that comes from rain instead of snow. The Baltic Sea could see a surface water temperature increase of up to 4 °C (7 °F). This will decrease sea ice cover by the end of the century.

The Swedish Civil Contingencies Agency (MSB) produces guidelines and resources to help citizens adapt to climate change. The MSB keeps flood and landslide maps online, and guidelines for decision-making in case of disasters.

Governmental efforts include policy instruments and legislation to mitigate and adapt to climate change. Policy instruments include taxing carbon dioxide emissions, issuing renewable energy certificates, subsidizing renewable energy initiatives, and making investments in R&D.

It is predicted that as the Barents Sea gets less frozen in the coming winters, becoming thus "Atlantified", additional evaporation will increase future snowfalls in Sweden and much of continental Europe.

== Examples ==
=== Climate charts ===
Gothenburg

Climate chart (precipitation, max. and min. temperature)
| J | F | M | A | M | J | J | A | S | O | N | D |
| 62 3 −1 | 41 3 −2 | 50 6 0 | 42 12 4 | 51 17 8 | 61 20 12 | 68 23 15 | 77 22 14 | 81 18 11 | 84 12 6 | 84 7 3 | 75 4 0 |
- █ Average max. and min. temperatures in °C
- █ Precipitation totals in mm
- Source: Climatedata.eu
Imperial conversion
| J | F | M | A | M | J | J | A | S | O | N | D |
| 2.4 37 30 | 1.6 37 28 | 2 43 32 | 1.7 54 39 | 2 63 46 | 2.4 68 54 | 2.7 73 59 | 3 72 57 | 3.2 64 52 | 3.3 54 43 | 3.3 45 37 | 3 39 32 |
- █ Average max. and min. temperatures in °F
- █ Precipitation totals in inches

Kiruna

Climate chart (precipitation, max. and min. temperature)
| J | F | M | A | M | J | J | A | S | O | N | D |
| 30 −11 −21 | 25 −8 −22 | 26 −4 −18 | 26 0 −9 | 33 8 −1 | 48 15 5 | 86 18 7 | 73 15 5 | 49 10 0 | 47 −2 −10 | 41 −6 −13 | 34 −8 −19 |
- █ Average max. and min. temperatures in °C
- █ Precipitation totals in mm
- Source: SMHI.se
Imperial conversion
| J | F | M | A | M | J | J | A | S | O | N | D |
| 1.2 12 −6 | 1 18 −8 | 1 25 0 | 1 32 16 | 1.3 46 30 | 1.9 59 41 | 3.4 64 45 | 2.9 59 41 | 1.9 50 32 | 1.9 28 14 | 1.6 21 9 | 1.3 18 −2 |
- █ Average max. and min. temperatures in °F
- █ Precipitation totals in inches

Nyköping

Climate chart (precipitation, max. and min. temperature)
| J | F | M | A | M | J | J | A | S | O | N | D |
| 40 1 −4 | 25 1 −4 | 25 6 −2 | 30 11 1 | 30 16 6 | 45 21 10 | 60 23 13 | 50 22 12 | 55 17 8 | 45 11 5 | 50 6 2 | 45 3 −2 |
- █ Average max. and min. temperatures in °C
- █ Precipitation totals in mm
- Source: SMHI.se
Imperial conversion
| J | F | M | A | M | J | J | A | S | O | N | D |
| 1.6 34 25 | 1 34 25 | 1 43 28 | 1.2 52 34 | 1.2 61 43 | 1.8 70 50 | 2.4 73 55 | 2 72 54 | 2.2 63 46 | 1.8 52 41 | 2 43 36 | 1.8 37 28 |
- █ Average max. and min. temperatures in °F
- █ Precipitation totals in inches

Stockholm

Climate chart (precipitation, max. and min. temperature)
| J | F | M | A | M | J | J | A | S | O | N | D |
| 39 1 −3 | 27 1 −3 | 26 5 −1 | 30 11 3 | 30 17 7 | 45 21 12 | 72 24 15 | 66 22 14 | 55 17 10 | 50 10 6 | 53 5 2 | 46 2 −1 |
- █ Average max. and min. temperatures in °C
- █ Precipitation totals in mm
- Source: HKO
Imperial conversion
| J | F | M | A | M | J | J | A | S | O | N | D |
| 1.5 34 27 | 1.1 34 27 | 1 41 30 | 1.2 52 37 | 1.2 63 45 | 1.8 70 54 | 2.8 75 59 | 2.6 72 57 | 2.2 63 50 | 2 50 43 | 2.1 41 36 | 1.8 36 30 |
- █ Average max. and min. temperatures in °F
- █ Precipitation totals in inches

Swedish Meteorological Institute, SMHI's monthly average temperatures of some of their weather stations – for the latest scientific full prefixed thirty-year period 1961–1990 Next will be presented in year 2020. The weather stations are sorted from south towards north by their numbers.

=== Table ===
| stn.nr. | station | Jan | Feb | Mar | Apr | May | Jun | Jul | Aug | Sep | Oct | Nov | Dec | Annual |
|---|---|---|---|---|---|---|---|---|---|---|---|---|---|---|
| 5337 | Malmö | 0.1 | 0.0 | 2.2 | 6.4 | 11.6 | 15.8 | 17.1 | 16.8 | 13.6 | 9.8 | 5.3 | 1.9 | 8.4 |
| 6203 | Helsingborg | 0.6 | −0.1 | 2.0 | 6.0 | 11.2 | 15.3 | 16.7 | 16.6 | 13.6 | 9.9 | 5.2 | 1.8 | 8.3 |
| 6451 | Växjö | −2.8 | −2.8 | 0.0 | 4.7 | 10.2 | 14.3 | 15.3 | 14.9 | 11.2 | 7.0 | 2.3 | −1.2 | 6.1 |
| 7839 | Visby | −0.5 | −1.2 | 0.7 | 4.1 | 9.5 | 14.0 | 16.4 | 16.0 | 12.5 | 8.6 | 4.3 | 1.2 | 7.1 |
| 7447 | Jönköping | −2.6 | −2.7 | 0.3 | 4.7 | 10.0 | 14.5 | 15.9 | 15.0 | 11.3 | 7.5 | 2.8 | −0.7 | 6.3 |
| 7263 | Gothenburg | −0.9 | −0.9 | 2.0 | 6.0 | 11.6 | 15.5 | 16.6 | 16.2 | 12.8 | 9.1 | 4.4 | 1.0 | 7.8 |
| 8323 | Skövde | −2.8 | −2.9 | 0.0 | 4.6 | 10.6 | 15.0 | 16.2 | 15.2 | 11.1 | 7.1 | 2.2 | −1.1 | 6.3 |
| 8634 | Norrköping | −3.0 | −3.2 | 0.0 | 4.5 | 10.4 | 15.1 | 16.6 | 15.5 | 11.3 | 7.2 | 2.2 | −1.4 | 6.3 |
| 9516 | Örebro | −4.0 | −4.0 | −0.5 | 4.3 | 10.7 | 15.3 | 16.5 | 15.3 | 10.9 | 6.6 | 1.3 | −2.4 | 5.8 |
| 9720 | Stockholm Bromma | −3.5 | −3.7 | −0.5 | 4.3 | 10.4 | 15.2 | 16.8 | 15.8 | 11.4 | 7.0 | 2.0 | −1.8 | 6.1 |
| 9739 | Stockholm Arlanda | −4.3 | −4.6 | −1.0 | 3.9 | 9.9 | 14.8 | 16.5 | 15.2 | 10.7 | 6.4 | 1.2 | −2.6 | 5.5 |
| 10458 | Mora | −7.4 | −7.2 | −2.4 | 2.5 | 9.1 | 14.1 | 15.4 | 13.5 | 9.3 | 4.9 | −1.6 | −6.1 | 3.7 |
| 10740 | Gävle | −4.8 | −4.5 | −1.0 | 3.4 | 9.3 | 14.6 | 16.3 | 14.9 | 10.6 | 6.0 | 0.6 | −3.3 | 5.2 |
| 12724 | Sundsvall | −7.5 | −6.3 | −2.3 | 2.5 | 8.2 | 13.8 | 15.2 | 13.8 | 9.4 | 4.8 | −1.5 | −5.7 | 3.6 |
| 13410 | Östersund | −8.9 | −7.6 | −3.5 | 1.3 | 7.6 | 12.5 | 13.9 | 12.7 | 8.2 | 3.8 | −2.4 | −6.3 | 2.6 |
| 14050 | Umeå | −8.7 | −8.3 | −4.0 | 1.4 | 7.6 | 13.3 | 15.6 | 13.8 | 9.0 | 4.0 | −2.3 | −6.4 | 2.9 |
| 15045 | Skellefteå | −10.2 | −8.7 | −4.2 | 1.2 | 7.6 | 13.6 | 15.7 | 13.5 | 8.5 | 3.2 | −3.4 | −7.5 | 2.5 |
| 16288 | Luleå | −12.2 | −11.0 | −6.0 | 0.3 | 6.6 | 13.0 | 15.4 | 13.3 | 8.0 | 2.6 | −4.5 | −9.7 | 1.3 |
| 16395 | Haparanda | −12.1 | −11.4 | −6.8 | −0.5 | 6.1 | 12.8 | 15.4 | 13.2 | 8.0 | 2.5 | −4.2 | −9.5 | 1.1 |
| 16988 | Jokkmokk | −17.5 | −14.9 | −8.6 | −1.1 | 5.9 | 12.2 | 14.3 | 11.8 | 5.7 | −0.2 | −9.3 | −14.6 | -1.4 |
| 17897 | Tarfala (a mountain peak) | −11.8 | −11.3 | −10.6 | −7.5 | −1.9 | 3.2 | 6.4 | 5.3 | 0.8 | −3.9 | −7.9 | −10.7 | -4.2 |
| 18076 | Gällivare | −14.3 | −12.5 | −8.4 | −1.9 | 5.0 | 11.0 | 13.0 | 10.7 | 5.6 | −0.6 | −8.1 | −12.2 | -1.1 |
| 18094 | Kiruna | −13.9 | −12.5 | −8.7 | −3.2 | 3.4 | 9.6 | 12.0 | 9.8 | 4.6 | −1.4 | −8.1 | −11.9 | -1.7 |

Climate data for Stockholm (Observatorielunden), 1991-2020 normals and extremes
| Month | Jan | Feb | Mar | Apr | May | Jun | Jul | Aug | Sep | Oct | Nov | Dec | Year |
|---|---|---|---|---|---|---|---|---|---|---|---|---|---|
| Record high °C (°F) | 11.0 (51.8) | 11.6 (52.9) | 17.5 (63.5) | 26.1 (79.0) | 29.0 (84.2) | 31.7 (89.1) | 34.2 (93.6) | 32.1 (89.8) | 26.2 (79.2) | 19.5 (67.1) | 15.0 (59.0) | 12.7 (54.9) | 34.2 (93.6) |
| Mean maximum °C (°F) | 6.6 (43.9) | 7.1 (44.8) | 12.0 (53.6) | 18.8 (65.8) | 24.3 (75.7) | 27.5 (81.5) | 29.7 (85.5) | 28.2 (82.8) | 22.4 (72.3) | 15.8 (60.4) | 10.7 (51.3) | 8.5 (47.3) | 30.6 (87.1) |
| Mean daily maximum °C (°F) | 1.0 (33.8) | 1.2 (34.2) | 4.7 (40.5) | 10.7 (51.3) | 16.5 (61.7) | 20.8 (69.4) | 23.6 (74.5) | 22.1 (71.8) | 16.6 (61.9) | 10.1 (50.2) | 5.4 (41.7) | 2.5 (36.5) | 11.3 (52.3) |
| Daily mean °C (°F) | −1.0 (30.2) | −1.0 (30.2) | 1.6 (34.9) | 6.3 (43.3) | 11.4 (52.5) | 15.7 (60.3) | 18.7 (65.7) | 17.7 (63.9) | 13.1 (55.6) | 7.7 (45.9) | 3.6 (38.5) | 0.6 (33.1) | 7.9 (46.2) |
| Mean daily minimum °C (°F) | −2.9 (26.8) | −3.2 (26.2) | −1.1 (30.0) | 2.6 (36.7) | 7.1 (44.8) | 11.6 (52.9) | 14.8 (58.6) | 14.2 (57.6) | 10.2 (50.4) | 5.5 (41.9) | 1.9 (35.4) | −1.2 (29.8) | 5.0 (41.0) |
| Mean minimum °C (°F) | −11.2 (11.8) | −10.9 (12.4) | −7.5 (18.5) | −2.6 (27.3) | 1.9 (35.4) | 7.0 (44.6) | 10.6 (51.1) | 9.7 (49.5) | 4.6 (40.3) | −0.8 (30.6) | −4.5 (23.9) | −8.3 (17.1) | −13.7 (7.3) |
| Record low °C (°F) | −19.3 (−2.7) | −21.0 (−5.8) | −14.6 (5.7) | −6.7 (19.9) | −1.4 (29.5) | 3.7 (38.7) | 7.8 (46.0) | 6.5 (43.7) | 1.2 (34.2) | −6.4 (20.5) | −11.3 (11.7) | −18.5 (−1.3) | −21.0 (−5.8) |
| Average precipitation mm (inches) | 37.0 (1.46) | 29.4 (1.16) | 27.3 (1.07) | 29.2 (1.15) | 34.0 (1.34) | 61.7 (2.43) | 61.5 (2.42) | 66.2 (2.61) | 53.3 (2.10) | 51.4 (2.02) | 47.6 (1.87) | 47.8 (1.88) | 546.4 (21.51) |
| Average snowfall cm (inches) | 23.3 (9.2) | 25.6 (10.1) | 18.1 (7.1) | 5.9 (2.3) | 1.1 (0.4) | 0.0 (0.0) | 0.0 (0.0) | 0.0 (0.0) | 0.0 (0.0) | 1.8 (0.7) | 6.6 (2.6) | 20.3 (8.0) | 102.7 (40.4) |
| Mean monthly sunshine hours | 44 | 75 | 151 | 217 | 278 | 277 | 279 | 235 | 170 | 96 | 45 | 33 | 1,900 |
Source 1: SMHI Open Data
Source 2: SMHI 1991-2020 normals

== See also ==
- Climate of Norway
- Geography of Sweden
