= Beddingestrand =

Swedish locality

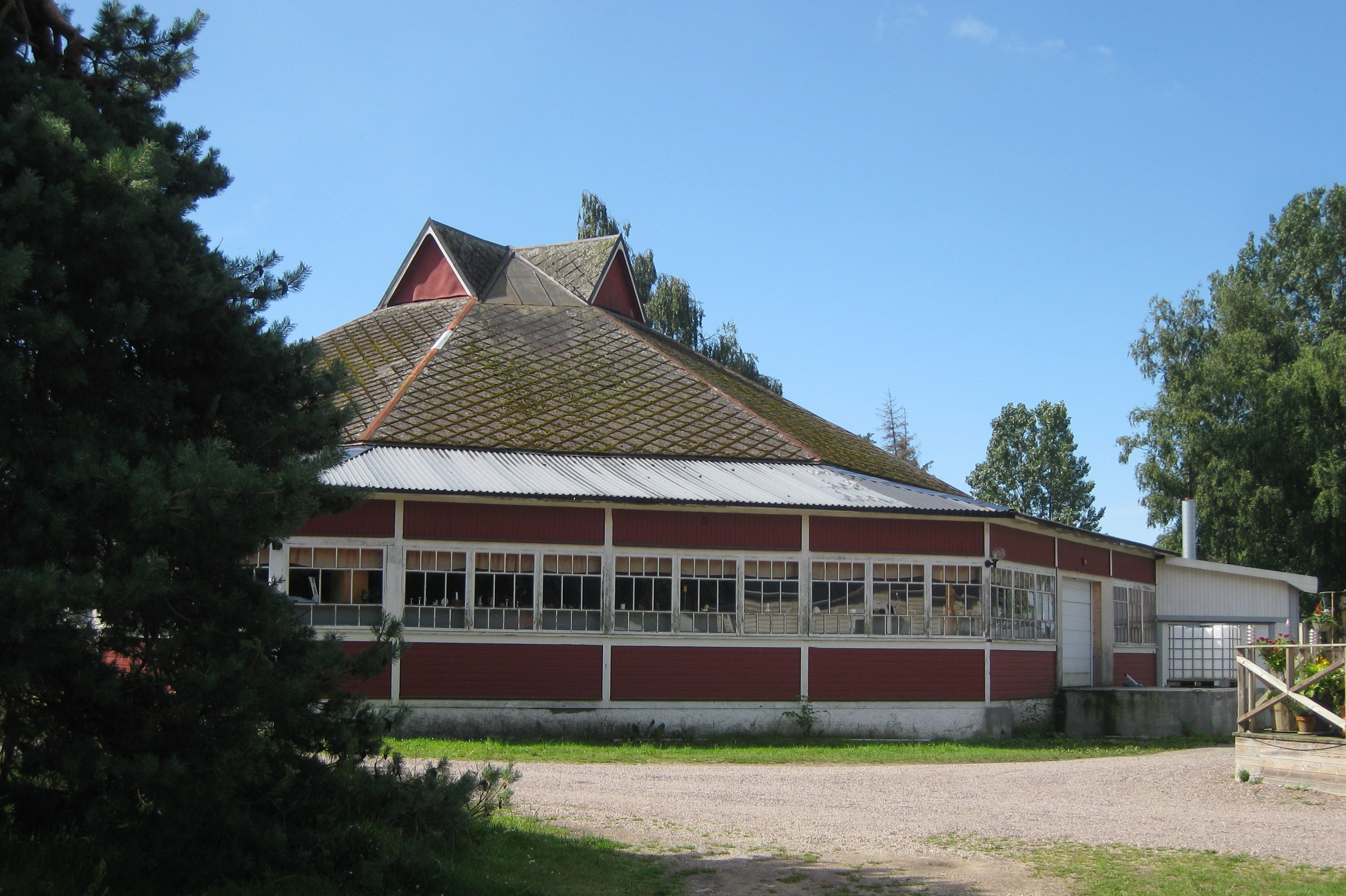
- Granhyddan in Beddingestrand in Scania, Sweden

- Location within Skåne Location within Sweden
- Coordinates: 55°21′N 13°27′E
- Country: Sweden
- Province: Skåne
- County: Skåne County
- Municipality: Trelleborg Municipality

Area
  - Total: 1.01 km^{2} (0.39 sq mi)

Population (31 December 2010)
  - Total: 678
  - Density: 672/km^{2} (1,740/sq mi)
- Time zone: UTC+1 (CET)
  - Summer (DST): UTC+2 (CEST)

Beddingestrand is a locality situated in Trelleborg Municipality, Skåne County, Sweden with 678 inhabitants in 2010.

It is known for its white sand beach and shallow waters allowing nice beach holidays in June to August.
