= Alstad =

Locality in Sweden

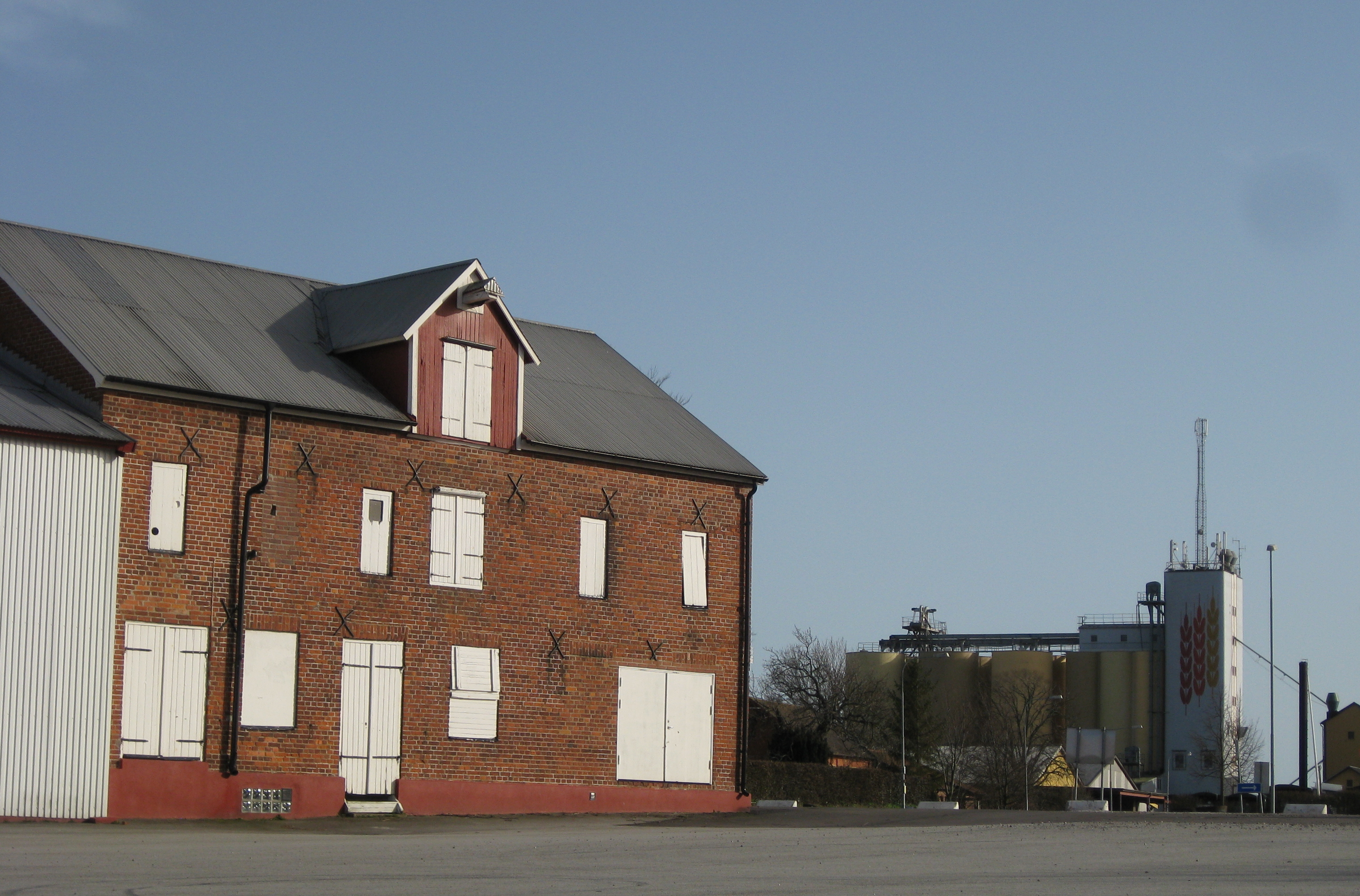
- Warehouse in Alstad

- Location within Skåne Location within Sweden
- Coordinates: 55°27′N 13°13′E
- Country: Sweden
- Province: Skåne
- County: Skåne County
- Municipality: Trelleborg Municipality

Area
  - Total: 0.23 km^{2} (0.089 sq mi)

Population (31 December 2010)
  - Total: 237
  - Density: 1,024/km^{2} (2,650/sq mi)
- Time zone: UTC+1 (CET)
  - Summer (DST): UTC+2 (CEST)

Alstad is a locality situated in Trelleborg Municipality, Skåne County, Sweden with 237 inhabitants in 2010.
