= Anderslöv =

Locality in Sweden

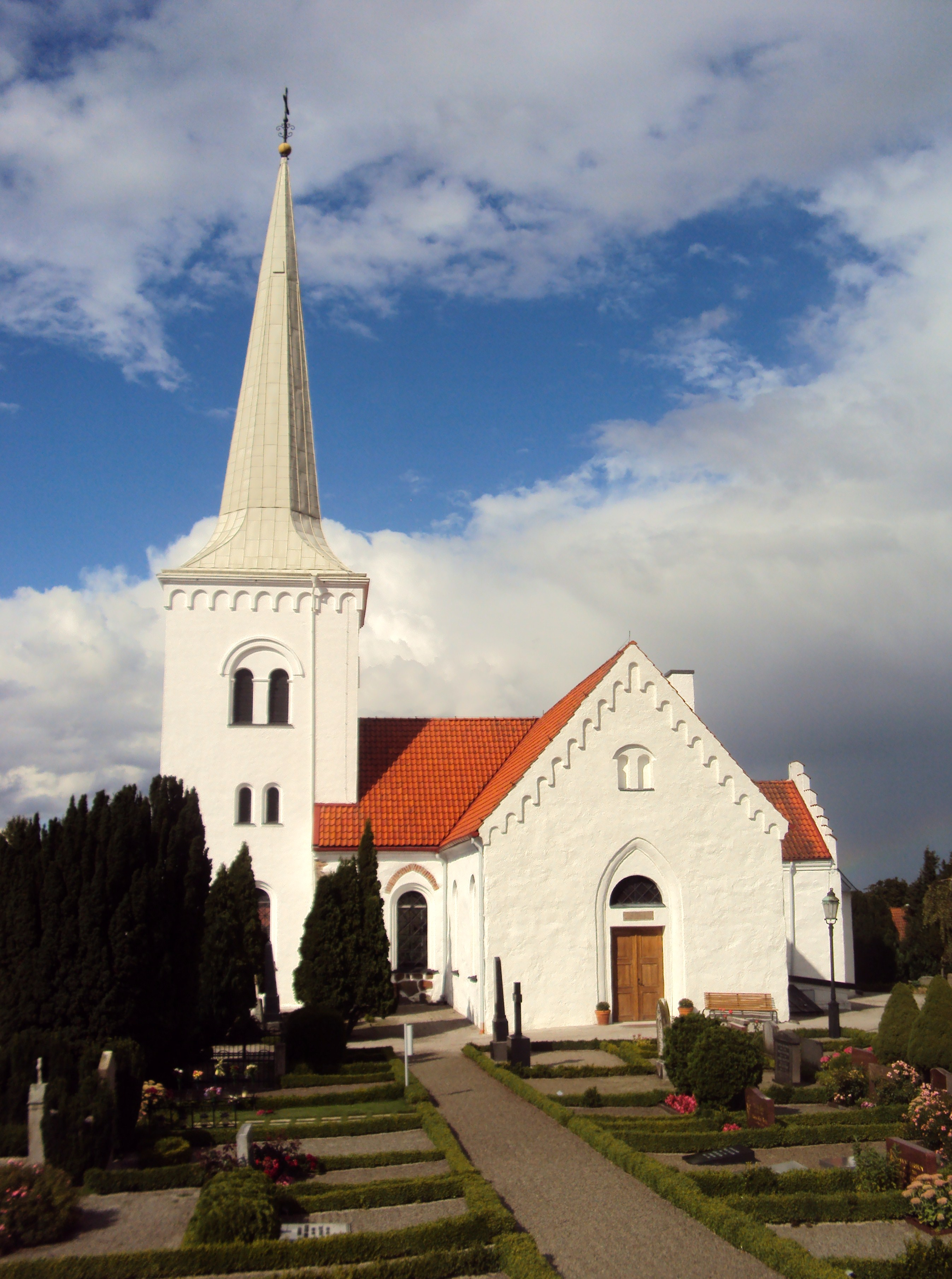
- Anderslöv Church

- Location within Skåne Location within Sweden
- Coordinates: 55°26′N 13°20′E
- Country: Sweden
- Province: Skåne
- County: Skåne County
- Municipality: Trelleborg Municipality

Area
  - Total: 1.03 km^{2} (0.40 sq mi)

Population (31 December 2010)
  - Total: 1,808
  - Density: 1,761/km^{2} (4,560/sq mi)
- Time zone: UTC+1 (CET)
  - Summer (DST): UTC+2 (CEST)

Anderslöv is a locality situated in Trelleborg Municipality, Skåne County, Sweden with 1,808 inhabitants in 2010. Its 12th-century Romanesque church is noted for its old frescos.

== In popular culture ==
An important part of the Sjöwall and Wahlöö novel Cop Killer (Polismördaren) is fictitiously situated in Anderslöv.

In 2012, Johan Pettersson earned the Ig Nobel Prize in Chemistry for discovering why residents of some new houses in Anderslöv saw their hair turn green. He found that hot water left in pipes overnight peeled copper from them, leading to very high copper levels in the water.
