= Klagstorp =

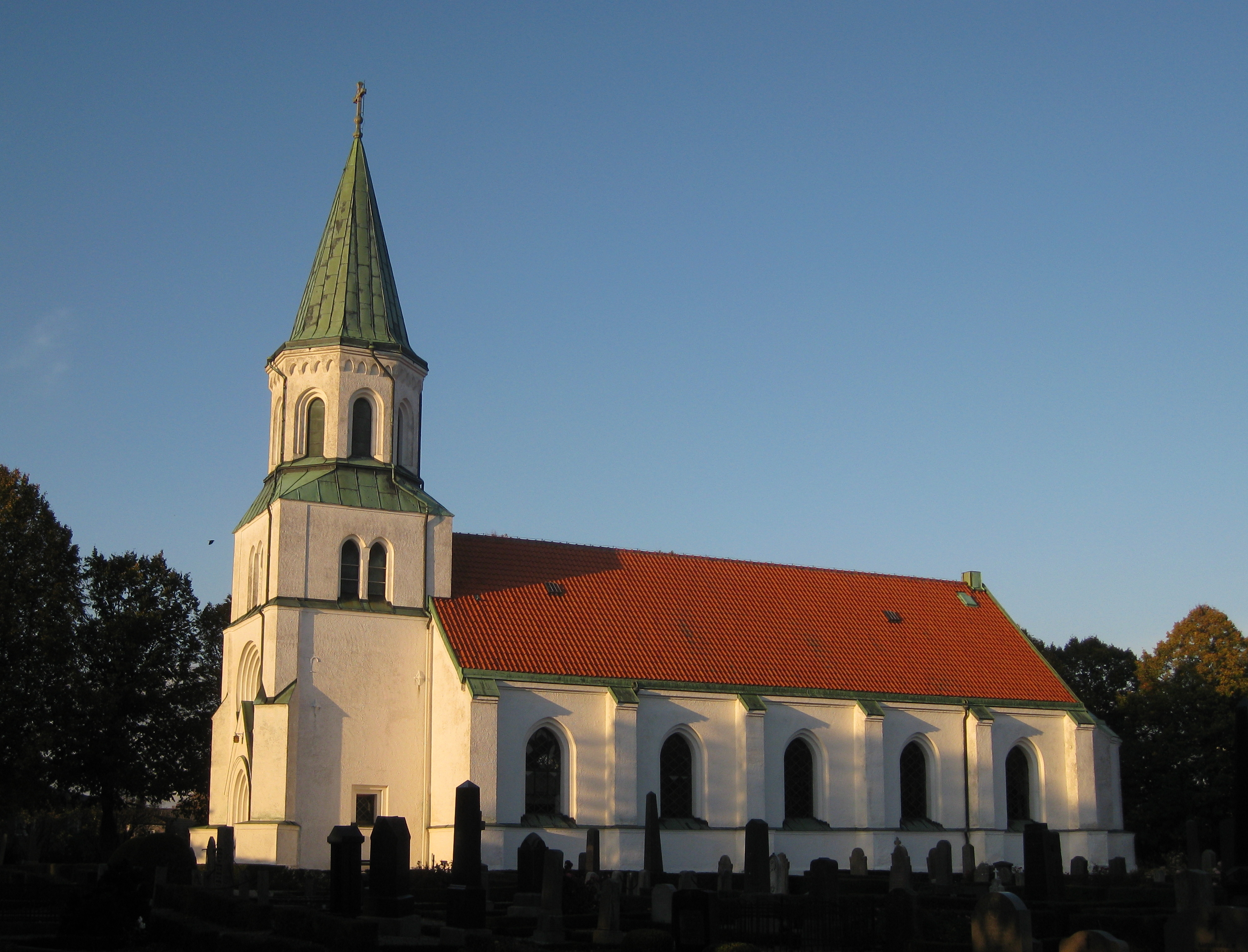
- Östra Klagstorp Church in Klagstorp

- Location within Skåne Location within Sweden
- Coordinates: 55°23′N 13°23′E
- Country: Sweden
- Province: Skåne
- County: Skåne County
- Municipality: Trelleborg Municipality

Area
  - Total: 0.38 km^{2} (0.15 sq mi)

Population (31 December 2010)
  - Total: 323
  - Density: 847/km^{2} (2,190/sq mi)
- Time zone: UTC+1 (CET)
  - Summer (DST): UTC+2 (CEST)

Klagstorp (Swedish pronunciation: [ˈklǎkstɔrp]) is a locality situated in Trelleborg Municipality, Skåne County, Sweden, with 323 inhabitants in 2010.
