= Skegrie =

Skegrie, Skåne
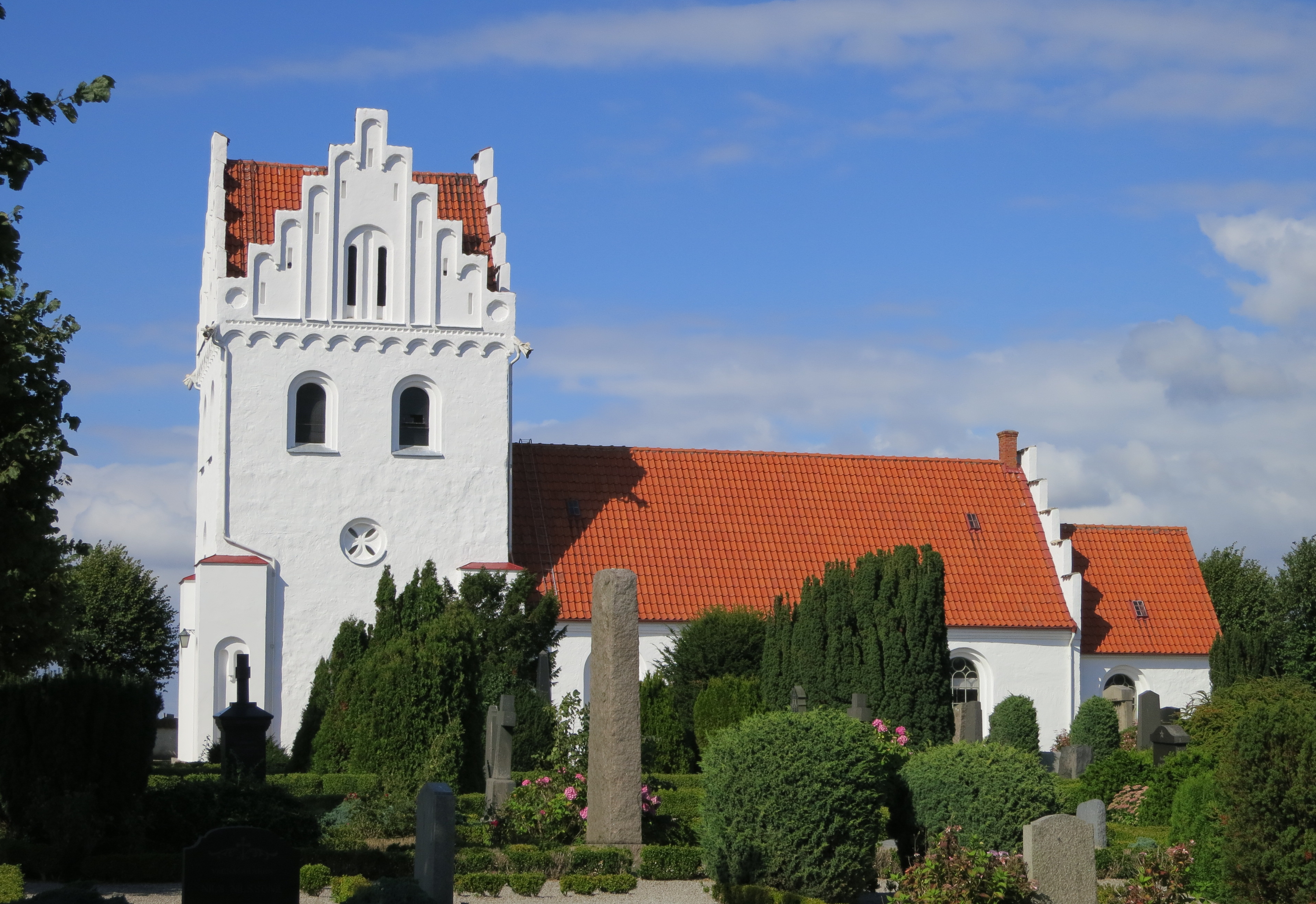
- Skegrie Church

- Location within Skåne Location within Sweden
- Coordinates: 55°24′N 13°04′E
- Country: Sweden
- Province: Skåne
- County: Skåne County
- Municipality: Trelleborg Municipality

Area
  - Total: 0.69 km^{2} (0.27 sq mi)

Population (31 December 2010)
  - Total: 1,106
  - Density: 1,608/km^{2} (4,160/sq mi)
- Time zone: UTC+1 (CET)
  - Summer (DST): UTC+2 (CEST)

Skegrie (Swedish pronunciation: [ˈɧêːɡrɪɛ]) is a locality situated in Trelleborg Municipality, Skåne County, Sweden with 1,106 inhabitants in 2010.
