= Smygehuk =

Southernmost place in Sweden

Coordinates: 55°20′14″N 13°21′30″E

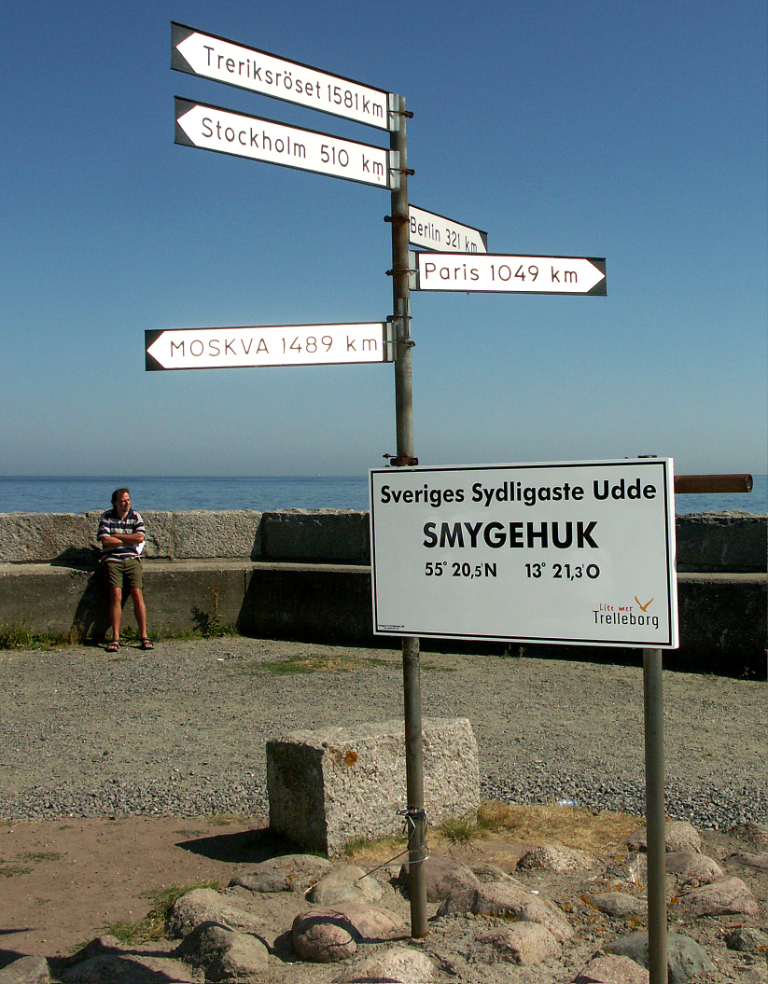
Signpost at Smygehuk, the southernmost point of Sweden. One of the places pointed to is Treriksröset, the northern tip of the country.

Smygehuk is a harbour and fishing village at Smygehamn in Skåne, Sweden. It is most known for being the southernmost point of Sweden, and the entire Scandinavian Peninsula (55° 20' N). To the west of the harbour are Smygehuk Lighthouse and Smygehuk Hostel.

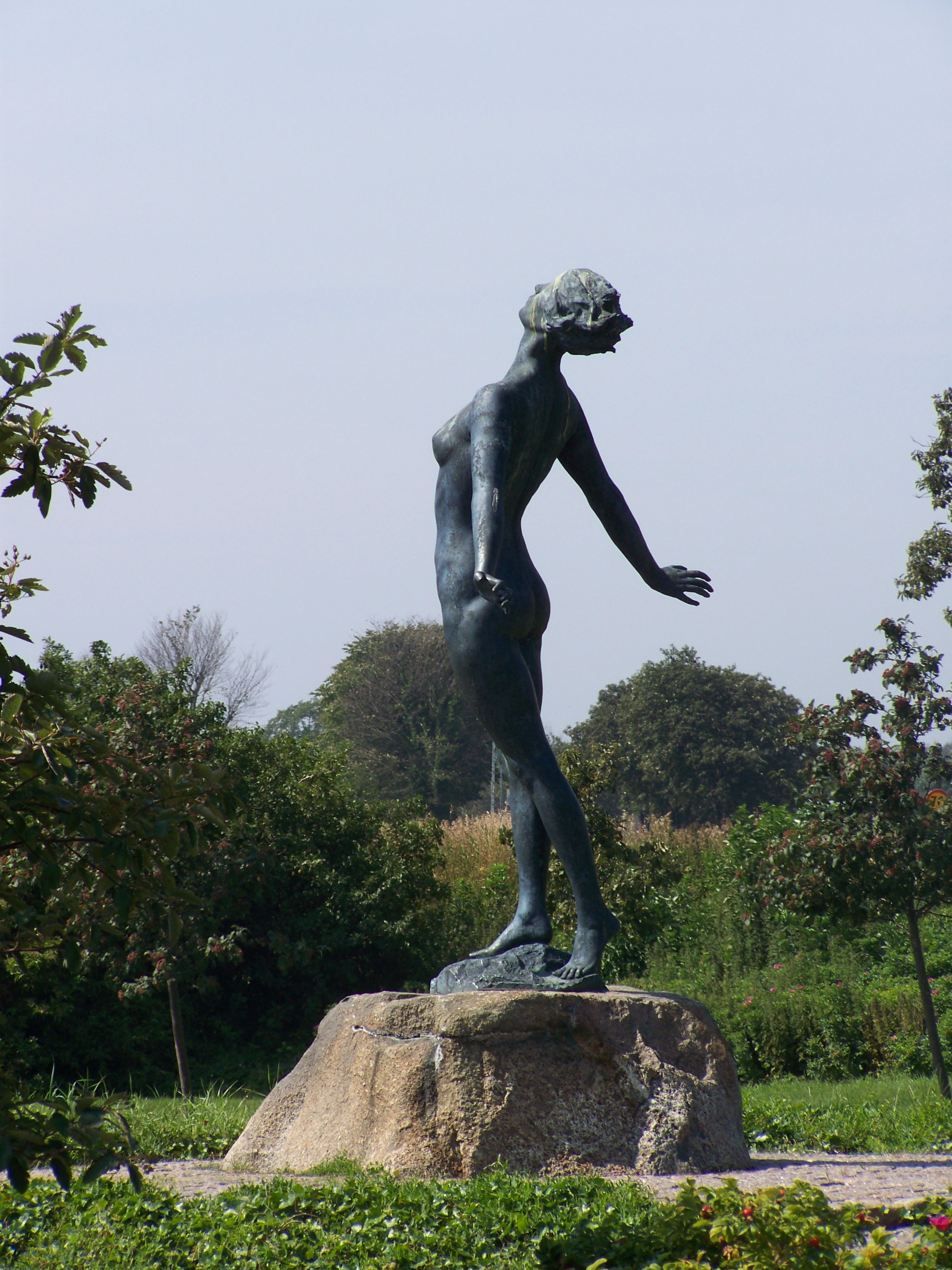
Statue of Birgit Holmquist

A statue of a nude woman stands in the harbour. It was made by artist Axel Ebbe and installed in 1930. It is named Famntaget ("The Embrace"). The model for the statue was Birgit Holmquist, mother of the model Nena von Schlebrügge, and grandmother and great-grandmother of actresses Uma Thurman and Maya Hawke, respectively.

The village is traversed by the Skåneleden hiking path SL7 Sydkust (South coast), running between Skåre and Ystad.
