= Smygehamn =

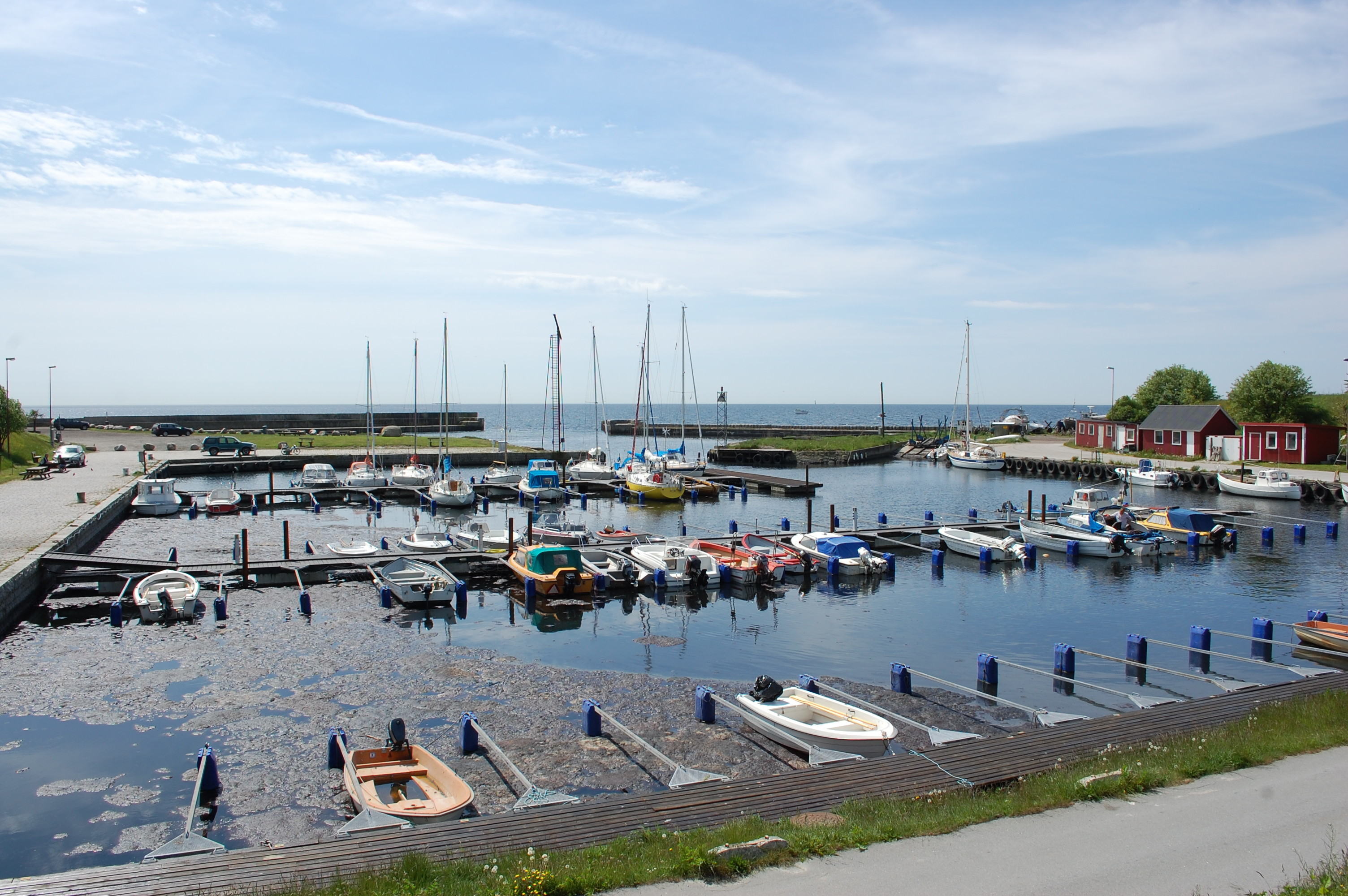
- Smygehamn harbour at Smygehuk

- Location within Sweden
- Coordinates: 55°20′42.5″N 13°23′21.8″E
- Country: Sweden
- Province: Skåne
- County: Skåne County
- Municipality: Trelleborg Municipality

Area
  - Total: 1.05 km^{2} (0.41 sq mi)

Population (31 December 2010)
  - Total: 1,278
  - Density: 1,220/km^{2} (3,200/sq mi)
- Time zone: UTC+1 (CET)
  - Summer (DST): UTC+2 (CEST)

Smygehamn is the southernmost locality situated in Trelleborg Municipality, Skåne County, Sweden (and thus Sweden's southernmost locality) with 1,287 inhabitants in 2020.

Between 1887–1957 Smygehamn had Sweden's southernmost railway station (called Östratorp after the parish).

Sweden's southernmost point, Smygehuk, is situated about 1 km to the south-west.

== Notable natives and residents ==
- Andreas Isaksson (football goalkeeper)
