= Trelleborg Municipality =

Trelleborg Municipality Trelleborgs kommun
- Municipality
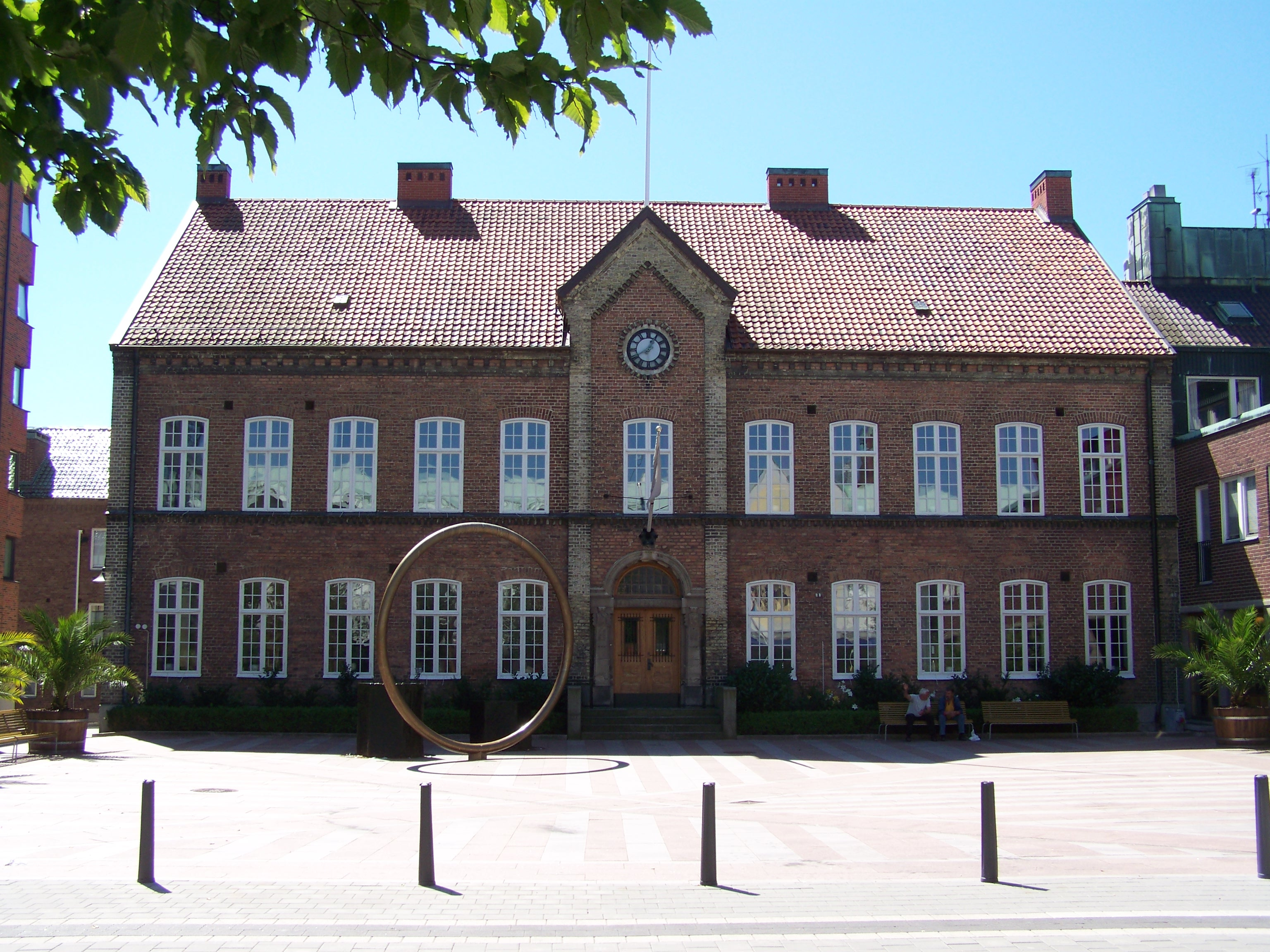
- Trelleborg City Hall

- Coat of arms

- Coordinates: 55°22′N 13°10′E
- Country: Sweden
- County: Skåne County
- Seat: Trelleborg

Area
  - Total: 1,175.03 km^{2} (453.68 sq mi)
  - Land: 339.87 km^{2} (131.22 sq mi)
  - Water: 835.16 km^{2} (322.46 sq mi)
- Area as of 1 January 2014.

Population (30 June 2025)
  - Total: 47,318
  - Density: 139.22/km^{2} (360.59/sq mi)
- Time zone: UTC+1 (CET)
  - Summer (DST): UTC+2 (CEST)
- ISO 3166 code: SE
- Province: Scania
- Municipal code: 1287
- Website: www.trelleborg.se

Trelleborg Municipality (Swedish: Trelleborgs kommun) is the southernmost municipality of Sweden, in Skåne County. Its seat is located in the city Trelleborg.

The present municipality was created in 1967 through the amalgamation of the City of Trelleborg with five rural municipalities. It consists of over thirty original local government units.

The municipality boasts 35 kilometers of predominantly sandy beach in the south, beech woods to the north, and in between one of the most fertile soils in the world.

== Localities ==
There are 8 urban areas (also called a Tätort or locality) in Trelleborg Municipality.

In the table they are listed according to the size of the population as of December 31, 2005. The municipal seat is in bold characters.

#	Locality	Population
1	**Trelleborg**	25,643
2	Anderslöv	1,680
3	Gislövs läge och Simremarken	1,462
4	Smygehamn	1,174
5	Skegrie	745
6	Beddingestrand	644
7	Klagstorp	341
8	Alstad	252

== Demographics ==
This is a demographic table based on Trelleborg Municipality's electoral districts in the 2022 Swedish general election sourced from SVT's election platform, in turn taken from SCB official statistics.

In total there were 46,136 residents, including 34,670 Swedish citizens of voting age. 37.3% voted for the left coalition and 61.4% for the right coalition. Indicators are in percentage points except population totals and income.

Location	Residents	Citizen adults	Left vote	Right vote	Employed	Swedish parents	Foreign heritage	Income SEK	Degree
Location			%	%					
Akka	1,118	858	46.8	52.0	71	61	39	20,638	29
Alstad-Villie-Minnesberg	1,480	1,127	27.6	71.3	82	87	13	27,797	34
Anderslöv	2,510	1,867	31.8	67.3	82	87	13	26,137	34
Barnängen-Rådmansgatan	1,133	926	37.8	60.7	79	76	24	23,167	27
Beddingestrand-Källstorp	2,256	1,918	34.9	64.1	79	89	11	27,638	45
Centrum-SSG Västra	1,940	1,423	38.1	60.4	67	65	35	19,249	26
Centrum-SSG Östra	1,564	1,191	42.6	55.3	70	71	29	21,623	26
Dalköpinge-Gislövs by	1,844	1,391	31.1	68.3	88	87	13	31,326	38
Fagerängen-Ö stranden	1,831	1,246	49.3	47.9	68	56	44	20,075	26
Gislövs läge-Strandmark	1,842	1,467	35.6	63.8	86	90	10	30,554	54
Granlunda-Knäckekärr	2,015	1,578	38.6	61.1	87	85	15	27,875	36
Grönby-Önnarp	845	633	28.8	69.6	82	86	14	28,500	34
Gylle-Bösarp	587	468	37.0	62.7	81	87	13	28,534	42
Hallabacken-Prästahejdan	1,352	1,039	41.2	58.1	77	70	30	23,466	30
Högalid-Söderslätthallen	1,059	910	38.3	59.6	82	76	24	23,857	31
Johan Kocksgatan	2,518	1,877	38.7	59.6	68	57	43	20,756	29
Järnvägsgatan	2,109	1,385	40.3	59.0	76	68	32	22,530	34
Kattebäck	2,233	1,711	41.6	56.7	78	75	25	22,955	27
Klagstorp-Simremarken	1,971	1,481	30.9	68.4	82	84	16	27,238	37
Liljeborg-Parken	1,671	1,238	39.9	57.1	77	69	31	22,542	32
Pilevall-Kyrkoköpinge	1,264	995	42.4	55.0	73	60	40	24,021	33
Skegrie-Stavstensudde	3,026	2,122	31.7	67.2	85	88	12	32,563	51
Smygehamn	1,533	1,238	36.6	62.4	81	88	12	26,583	46
Stavstensv.-Bäckaskolan	1,244	919	33.8	64.9	85	80	20	28,614	33
Tommarp-Hammarlöv	1,232	776	33.5	66.4	86	85	15	29,755	45
Vannhög-Västervång	2,275	1,785	38.2	61.0	85	79	21	28,442	36
Österlid-Sockenvägen	1,684	1,101	48.8	48.1	65	47	53	18,645	21
Source: SVT

== Elections ==
Below are the results since the 1973 municipal reform listed. Between 1988 and 1998 the Sweden Democrats' results were not published by the SCB due to the party's small size nationwide. "Turnout" denotes the percentage of the electorate casting a ballot, but "Votes" only applies to valid ballots cast.

=== Riksdag ===
Year	Turnout	Votes	V	S	MP	C	L	KD	M	SD	ND
1973	92.0	22,144	1.6	53.8	0.0	24.9	6.5	1.1	11.4	0.0	0.0
1976	92.7	22,779	1.5	52.8	0.0	21.2	9.8	0.8	13.8	0.0	0.0
1979	91.7	22,809	1.5	52.6	0.0	14.4	10.4	0.7	20.1	0.0	0.0
1982	92.2	23,112	2.0	54.9	0.8	13.6	5.2	0.8	22.7	0.0	0.0
1985	90.0	22,870	1.7	54.2	1.2	10.2	10.5	0.0	22.0	0.0	0.0
1988	86.4	22,271	2.5	54.1	5.0	9.4	7.8	1.2	18.9	0.0	0.0
1991	87.2	23,267	2.2	46.2	2.4	6.3	6.3	5.3	22.5	0.0	5.3
1994	87.8	23,913	2.8	56.7	3.2	5.8	3.8	2.5	21.8	0.0	2.2
1998	80.6	22,235	7.8	45.0	2.9	3.6	2.4	9.6	22.1	0.0	0.0
2002	78.5	22,565	4.1	48.1	2.8	4.1	9.7	7.1	14.9	4.9	0.0
2006	81.1	24,241	2.6	39.8	2.8	4.9	6.4	5.9	23.8	9.0	0.0
2010	83.2	26,202	2.5	30.6	3.9	4.0	5.8	3.7	34.1	13.8	0.0
2014	84.6	27,191	2.5	32.8	4.3	4.0	3.9	2.5	23.9	23.8	0.0
2018	86.35	28,778	3.88	24.87	2.52	5.70	4.50	5.18	21.50	30.71	0.0

Blocs

This lists the relative strength of the socialist and centre-right blocs since 1973, but parties not elected to the Riksdag are inserted as "other", including the Sweden Democrats results from 1988 to 2006, but also the Christian Democrats pre-1991 and the Greens in 1982, 1985 and 1991. The sources are identical to the table above. The coalition or government mandate marked in bold formed the government after the election. New Democracy got elected in 1991 but are still listed as "other" due to the short lifespan of the party. "Elected" is the total number of percentage points from the municipality that went to parties who were elected to the Riksdag.

Year	Turnout	Votes	Left	Right	SD	Other	Elected
1973	92.0	22,144	**55.4**	42.8	0.0	1.8	98.2
1976	92.7	22,779	54.3	**44.8**	0.0	0.9	99.1
1979	91.7	22,809	54.1	**44.9**	0.0	1.0	99.0
1982	92.2	23,112	**56.9**	41.5	0.0	1.6	98.4
1985	90.0	22,870	**55.9**	42.7	0.0	1.4	98.6
1988	86.4	22,271	**61.6**	36.1	0.0	2.3	97.7
1991	87.2	23,267	48.4	**40.4**	0.0	11.2	94.1
1994	87.8	23,913	**62.7**	33.9	0.0	3.4	96.6
1998	80.6	22,235	**55.7**	37.7	0.0	6.6	93.4
2002	78.5	22,565	**55.0**	35.8	0.0	9.2	90.8
2006	81.1	24,241	45.2	**41.0**	0.0	13.8	86.2
2010	83.2	26,202	37.0	**47.6**	13.8	1.6	98.4
2014	84.6	27,191	**39.6**	34.3	23.8	2.3	97.7
2018	86.35	28,778	**33.05**	31.18	30.71	1.13	98.97

== Employment ==
Municipal work is the most common form of employment in Trelleborg, engaging over 4,000 individuals across 400 diverse roles. Additionally, the Trelleborg municipality ranks among the top ten largest employers in the Scania province.
