= List of lakes of Sweden =

The list of lakes of Sweden contains the major lakes in the nation of Sweden. However, Sweden has 22,600 lakes larger than 0.1 km^{2} (100,000 m^{2}) and over 97,500 lakes larger than 2 acres (8,100 m^{2}), so the list is far from comprehensive. Using 0.1 km^{2} surface area as the measuring limit, Sweden places fifth among countries with most lakes in the world. The great number of lakes in southern Sweden could, according to Alfred Gabriel Nathorst, be indebted to the creation of basins due to the stripping of an irregular mantle of weathered rock by glacier erosion.

== Alphabetical list ==
Some of the major lakes in Sweden:

- Agunnarydsjön
- Alkvettern
- Ånnsjön
- Åresjön
- Bolmen
- Boren
- Bosarpasjön
- Dellen
- Edasjön
- Gammelstadsviken, Norbotten
- Glan
- Hjälmaren
- Ikesjaure
- Kedträsket
- Lake Immeln
- Hornavan
- Mälaren
- Mien
- Roxen
- Runn
- Siljan
- Sommen
- Sparren
- Storavan
- Storvindeln
- Storsjön
- Torneträsk
- Tåkern
- Vänern
- Väsman
- Vättern
- Yngen

== Largest lakes by area ==
Lakes of Sweden by area
Rank	Lake	Area
1	Vänern	5,519 km^{2} (2,131 sq mi)
2	Vättern	1,886 km^{2} (728 sq mi)
3	Mälaren	1,090 km^{2} (420 sq mi)
4	Hjälmaren	477 km^{2} (184 sq mi)
5	Storsjön	456 km^{2} (176 sq mi)
6	Torneträsk	330 km^{2} (130 sq mi)
7	Siljan	292 km^{2} (113 sq mi)
8	Hornavan**	262 km^{2} (101 sq mi)
9	Akkajaure	260 km^{2} (100 sq mi)
10	Uddjaure	249 km^{2} (96 sq mi)

== Deepest lakes ==
Subject to geological variations

1. Hornavan - 228 m (748 ft)
2. Torneträsk - 168 m (551 ft)
3. Vojmsjön - 145 m (476 ft)
4. Stor-Blåsjön - 144 m (472 ft)
5. Stor-Rensjön - 140 m (460 ft)
6. Virihaure - 138 m (453 ft)
7. Kallsjön - 134 m (440 ft)
8. Vastenjaure - 134 m (440 ft)
9. Siljan - 134 m (440 ft)
10. Kultsjön - 130 m (430 ft)

== Largest lakes by volume ==
Lakes with the most water:

1. Vänern - 153 km^{3} (37 cu mi)
2. Vättern - 77.6 km^{3} (18.6 cu mi)
3. Torneträsk - 17.1 km^{3} (4.1 cu mi)
4. Mälaren - 14.3 km^{3} (3.4 cu mi)
5. Hornavan - 11.9 km^{3} (2.9 cu mi)
6. Siljan - 8.09 km^{3} (1.94 cu mi)
7. Storsjön - 8.02 km^{3} (1.92 cu mi)
8. Kallsjön - 6.14 km^{3} (1.47 cu mi)
9. Akkajaure - 5.9 km^{3} (1.4 cu mi)
10. Virihaure - 4.43 km^{3} (1.06 cu mi)
11. Storuman - 4.18 km^{3} (1.00 cu mi)

== Water life ==
- In lakes and rivers, there are a total of 52 species of fresh water fish; but several of them are rare.

== See also ==
- Geography of Sweden
- List of islands of Sweden
- List of rivers of Sweden
