= Skellefte River =

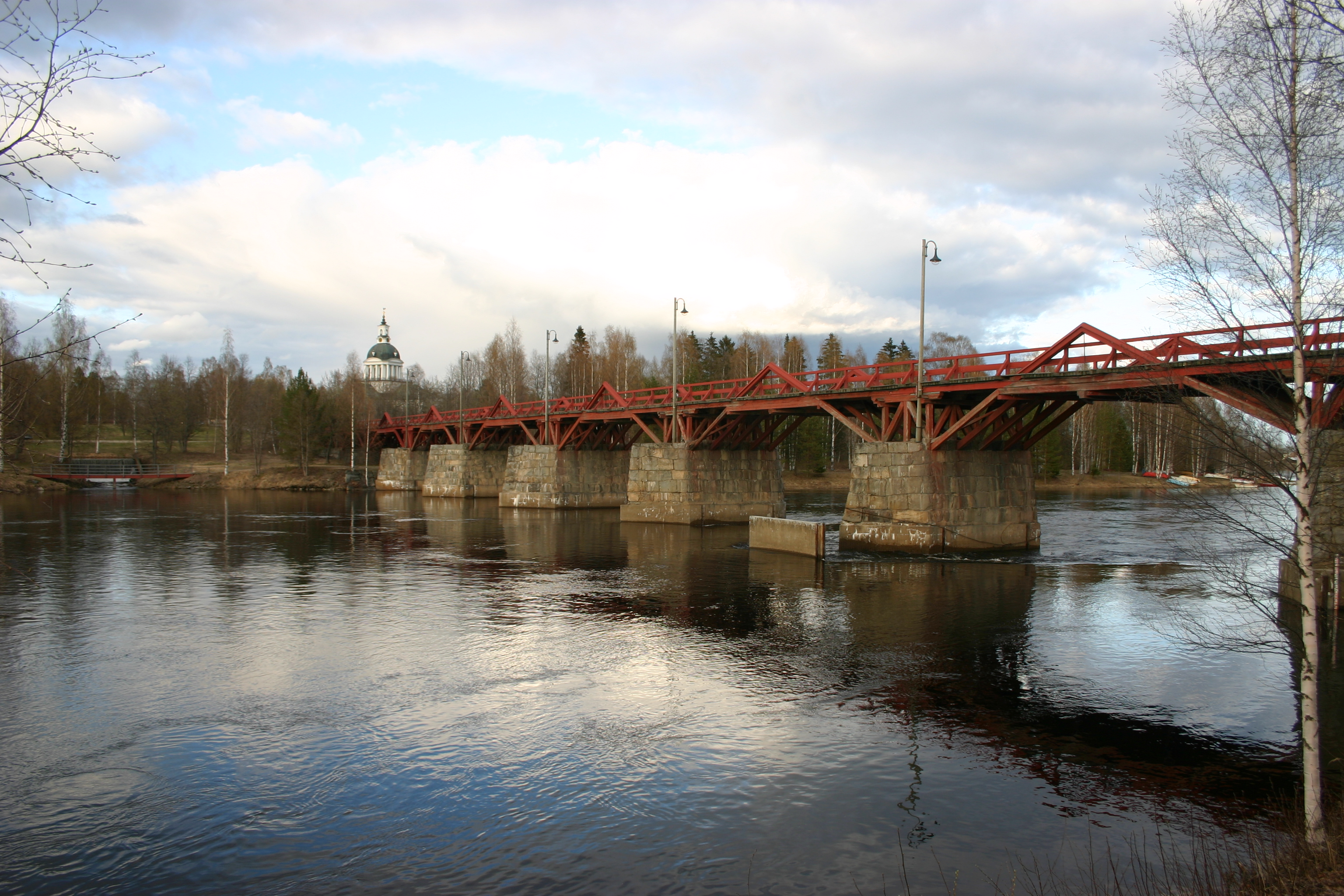
- Lejonströmsbron in Skellefteå

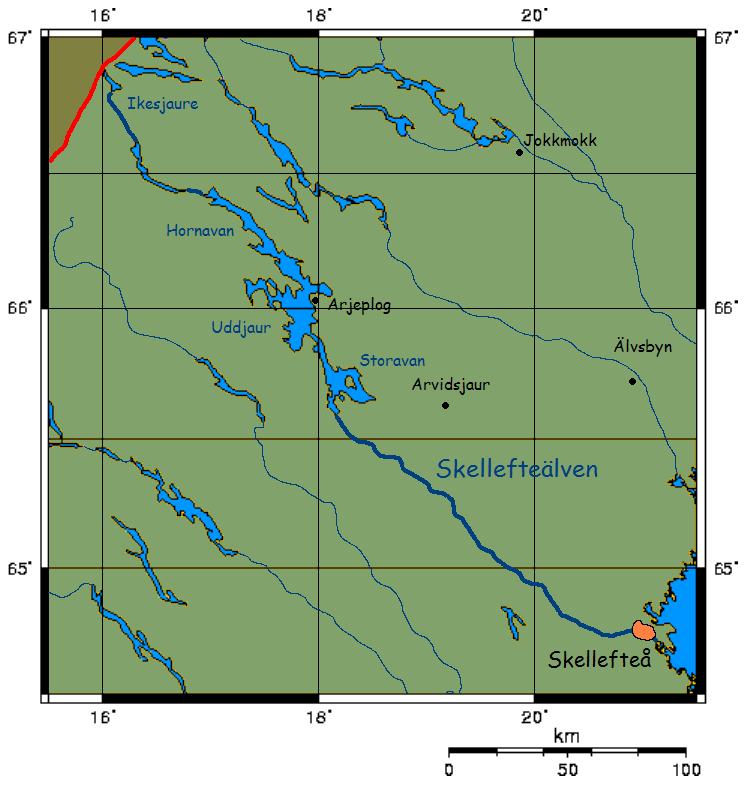
- Native name: Skellefteälven / Skellefte älv (Swedish); Seldutiedno (Pite Sami); Syöldateiednuo (Ume Sami)

Location
- Country: Sweden
- County: Norrbotten, Västerbotten

Physical characteristics
- Source: Ikesjaure
  - location: Arjeplog Municipality, Norrbotten County
  - coordinates: 66°48′56″N 16°7′6″E
- Mouth: Gulf of Bothnia
  - location: Skellefteå, Västerbotten County
  - coordinates: 64°42′23″N 21°9′13″E
  - elevation: 0 m (0 ft)
- Length: 410 km (250 mi)
- Basin size: 11,731.0 km^{2} (4,529.4 sq mi)
- Discharge
  - average: 157 m^{3}/s (5,500 cu ft/s)

The Skellefte River (Swedish: Skellefteälven or Skellefte älv; Pite Sami: Seldutiedno; Ume Sami: Syöldateiednuo) is a river in northern Sweden; one of the major Norrland rivers.

Geographically, it starts in Norrbotten County in the Swedish province Lappland, where it drains the lakes Hornavan, Uddjaur and Storavan near Arjeplog. Then, it goes south-east into Västerbotten County, passing through the town Skellefteå (which has given it its name), and finally discharging in the Gulf of Bothnia, in the province of Västerbotten. There are several tributaries to the river, with the largest ones named: Malån, Petikån, Finnforsån, Bjurån and Klintforsån.

It is one of the major northern Swedish rivers, with a length of 410 kilometers. Like many large northern rivers, it produces hydro power with some fifteen power stations.

Salmons and trouts are being put out to compensate for the water power plants, and the river and its tributary are all popular destinations for fishers.

== See also ==
Some of the other large Norrland rivers:

- Kalix River
- Torne River
- Lule River
- Pite River
- Ume River
- Ångerman River
