= Alter River =

- Location of the mouth in Sweden
- Native name: Alterälven (Swedish)

Location
- Country: Sweden
- County: Norrbotten
- Municipalities: Piteå, Älvsbyn

Physical characteristics
- Mouth: Håkansöfjärden in Bothnian Bay
  - coordinates: 65°24′10″N 21°29′50″E
  - elevation: 0 m (0 ft)
- Length: 60 km (37 mi)
- Basin size: 458.7 km^{2} (177.1 sq mi)
- Discharge
  - average: 8 m^{3}/s (280 cu ft/s)
  - maximum: 95 m^{3}/s (3,400 cu ft/s)

Alter River (Swedish: Alterälven) is a river in Sweden.
