= Espe =

Espe may refer to:

- Escuela Politécnica del Ejército, also called ESPE, a higher education university in Sangolquí, Ecuador
- Espe (Fulda), a river in Hesse, Germany, tributary of the Fulda
- Espe (manor house), a historic estate in Boeslunde, Slagelse Municipality, Denmark
- Vidsel Air Base, ICAO airport code ESPE, a Swedish Air Force airfield located near Vidsel
- Espe, Denmark, a village on the island Funen, Denmark
- Espe, Norway, a village in the county of Hordaland, Norway, see list of villages in Hordaland
- Aaron Espe (born 1981), American singer-songwriter, instrumentalist and record producer
