= North European Aerospace Test range =

Aerospace test range in Sweden

Coordinates: 66.3572°N 19.2777°E

North European Aerospace Test range (NEAT) in Sweden is Europe's largest overland test range for aerospace systems.

It is a co-operation by the Swedish Space Corporation and Swedish Defence Materiel Administration.

Its aim is to provide facilities and services for safe aerospace testing in one of the few parts of Europe which has very low population and almost no air-traffic.

== Physical attributes ==
NEAT consists of two ranges in northern Sweden, Esrange Space Center outside Kiruna and Vidsel Test Range, that are combined with a bridging area in-between the two ranges.

=== Size ===
The total size of NEAT is 24,000 km^{2}, and the one-way length is 350 km.

=== Restricted airspace ===
NEAT has two permanently restricted airspace areas.

- R01 covers Esrange Space Center and is 6,600 km^{2}, GND/UNL altitude.
- R02 covers Vidsel Test Range and is 7,200 km^{2}, GND/UNL altitude.

There is also four additional restricted airspace areas over the bridging area that are only used when needed.

- Over the west part, GND/3500 MSL
- Over the west part, 3500 MSL/FL200 (Note: A.k.a. "Tunnel in the sky")
- Over the whole area, 3500 MSL/FL330 in the west part and FL200/FL330 in the east part. (Note: Overflying the town of Kiruna)
- Over the whole area, FL470/UNL

=== Suspended and restricted ground space ===
==== Restricted ground-space ====
- Esrange Rocket Impact Area is 5,200 km^{2}.

==== Suspended ground-space ====
- Vidsel Test Range is 3,300 km^{2}.
