= Tjeggelvas =

Lake in Arjeplog Municipality, Sweden

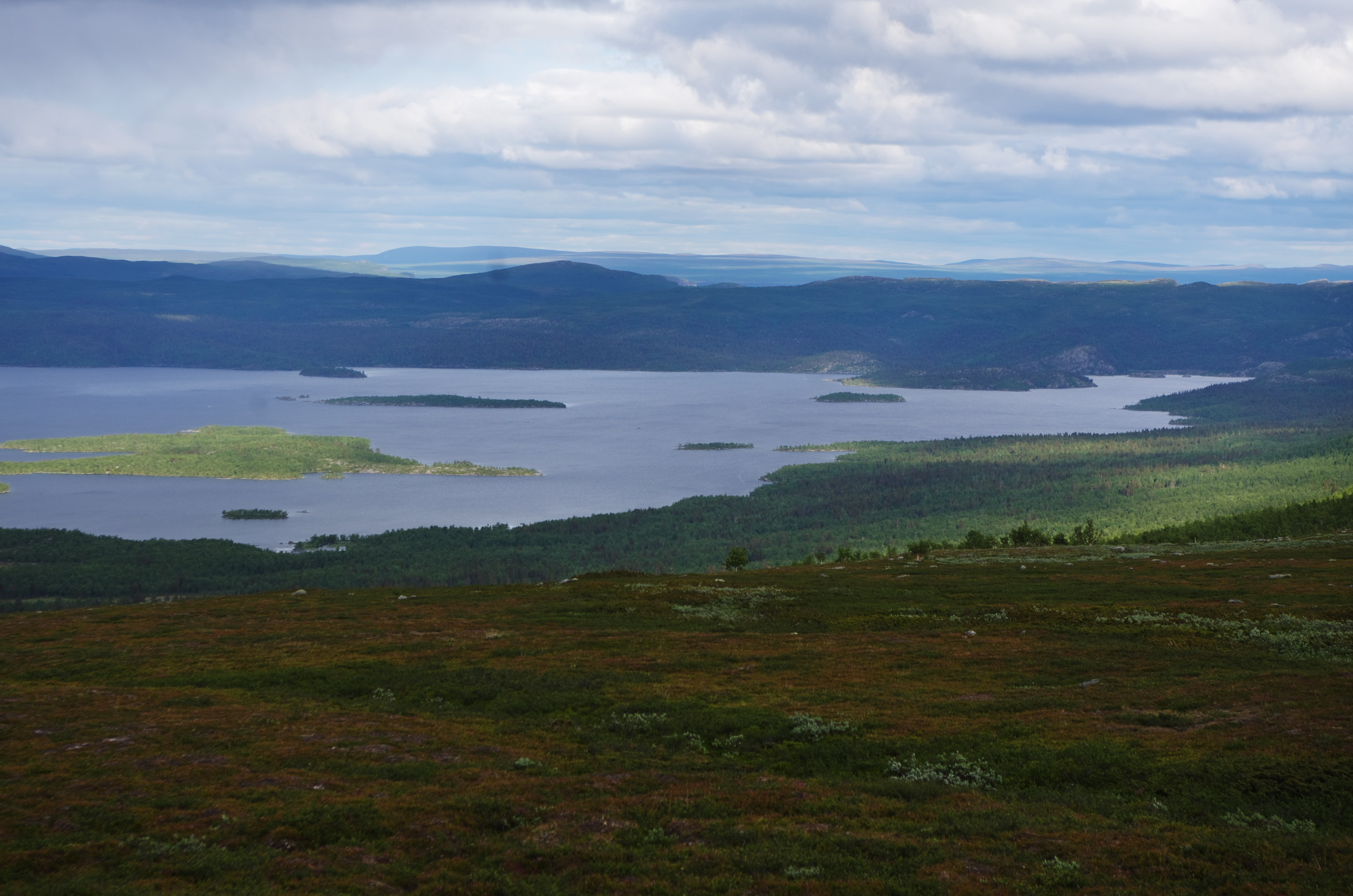

- Tjeggelvas in Sweden
- Location: Swedish Lapland
- Coordinates: 66°37′N 17°34′E
- Basin countries: Sweden
- Surface area: 66.8 km^{2} (25.8 sq mi)
- Max. depth: 65 m (213 ft)
- Shore length^{1}: 106 km (66 mi)
- Surface elevation: 450 m (1,480 ft)
- Settlements: Arjeplog, Jäckvik
- ^{1} Shore length is not a well-defined measure.

Tjeggelvas is a lake in northern Sweden. It is located in Arjeplog Municipality in the province of Swedish Lapland, and administratively of Norrbotten County and is part of the Pite River catchment area. Tjeggelvashas is on the western edge of the Scandinavian Mountains, with a high surface elevation of 450 m (1,480 ft). The nearest settlements, Jäkkvik and Arjeplog, are to the south, along the shores of the larger lake Hornavan.

The lake and surrounding area are within the nature reserve Tjeggelvas, formed in 1988, which covers 328 km^{2} (127 sq mi). Forests of old-growth pine take up a large amount of the protected area, but there are areas of spruce too, especially in the east.

== Geography ==
Tjeggelvas has a surface area of 66.8 km^{2} (25.8 sq mi) and a shore length of 106 km (66 mi).

=== Climate ===
Tjeggelvas has a subarctic climate (Köppen Dfc).

Climate data for Stenudden 1991-2020 normals (453m)
| Month | Jan | Feb | Mar | Apr | May | Jun | Jul | Aug | Sep | Oct | Nov | Dec | Year |
|---|---|---|---|---|---|---|---|---|---|---|---|---|---|
| Daily mean °C (°F) | −13.1 (8.4) | −12.5 (9.5) | −7.8 (18.0) | −1.5 (29.3) | 4.1 (39.4) | 9.8 (49.6) | 13.1 (55.6) | 11.2 (52.2) | 6.3 (43.3) | −0.3 (31.5) | −6.9 (19.6) | −10.6 (12.9) | −0.7 (30.8) |
| Average precipitation mm (inches) | 44.7 (1.76) | 35.6 (1.40) | 32.1 (1.26) | 27.7 (1.09) | 37.0 (1.46) | 61.8 (2.43) | 86.1 (3.39) | 72.4 (2.85) | 52.5 (2.07) | 46.1 (1.81) | 49.3 (1.94) | 48.1 (1.89) | 593.4 (23.35) |
Source: NOAA
