= Älvsbyn Municipality =

Älvsbyn Municipality Älvsbyns kommun
- Municipality
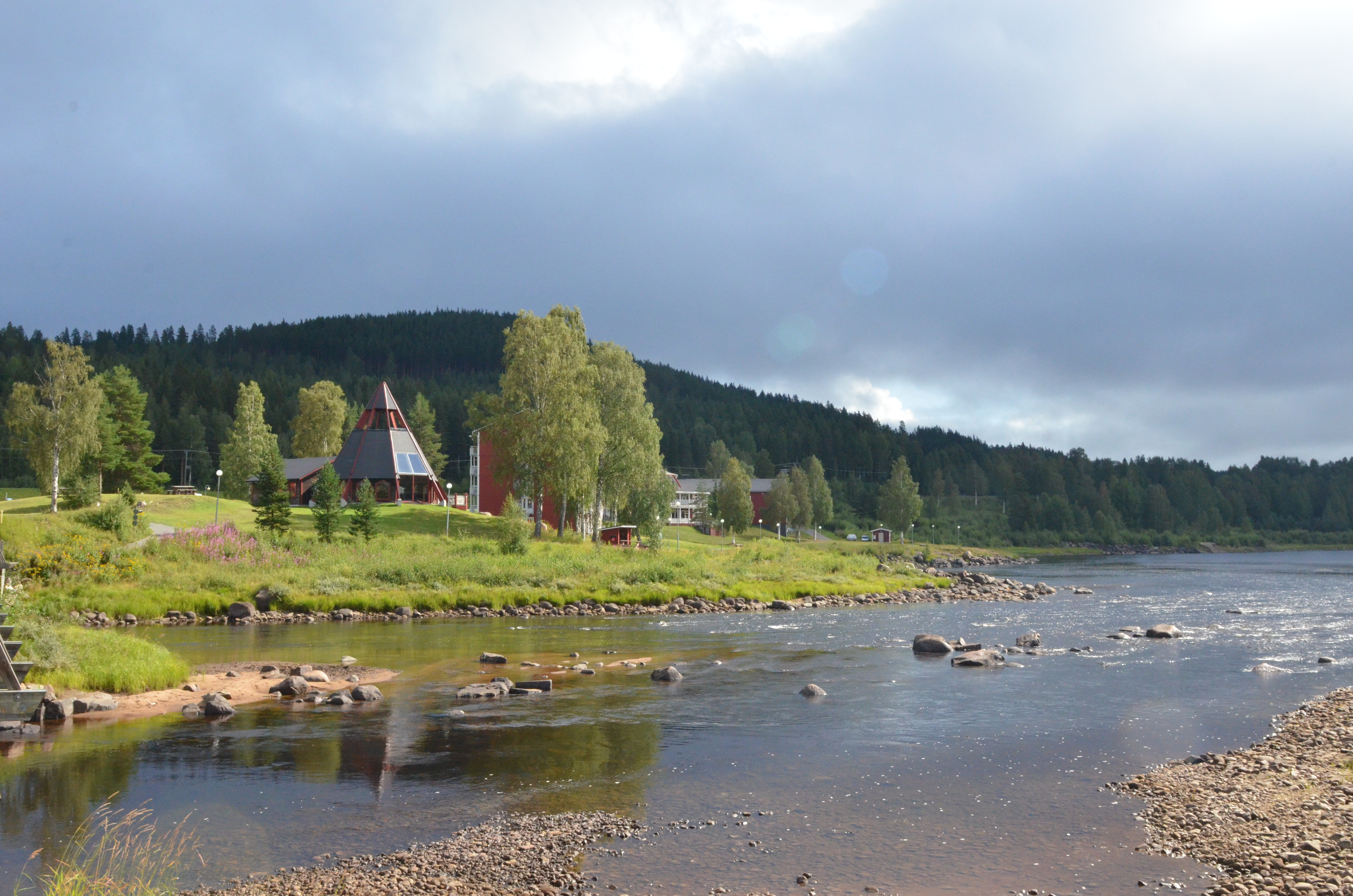
- Storforsen

- Coat of arms

- Coordinates: 65°41′N 21°01′E
- Country: Sweden
- County: Norrbotten County
- Seat: Älvsbyn

Area
  - Total: 1,795.24 km^{2} (693.15 sq mi)
  - Land: 1,698.04 km^{2} (655.62 sq mi)
  - Water: 97.2 km^{2} (37.5 sq mi)
- Area as of 1 January 2014.

Population (30 June 2025)
  - Total: 7,794
  - Density: 4.590/km^{2} (11.89/sq mi)
- Time zone: UTC+1 (CET)
  - Summer (DST): UTC+2 (CEST)
- ISO 3166 code: SE
- Province: Norrbotten
- Municipal code: 2560
- Website: www.alvsbyn.se

Älvsbyn Municipality (Swedish: Älvsbyns kommun) is a municipality in Norrbotten County in northern Sweden. Its seat is located in Älvsbyn.

The present municipality has the same size as the original one, created at the time the municipalities of Sweden were formed in 1863. 1948-1968 a part of it constituted a market town (köping) and a municipality of its own, but the entities were reunited in 1969.

== Geography ==
The municipality stretches along the Pite River for about 60 kilometres in a naturesque surrounding.

=== Localities ===
There are four localities (or urban areas) in Älvsbyn Municipality:

#	Locality	Population
1	**Älvsbyn**	5,042
2	Vidsel	569
3	Korsträsk	397
4	Vistträsk	258

The municipal seat in bold

== Demographics ==
This is a demographic table based on Älvsbyn Municipality's electoral districts in the 2022 Swedish general election sourced from SVT's election platform, in turn taken from SCB official statistics.

In total there were 8,003 residents, including 6,194 Swedish citizens of voting age. 57.5% voted for the left coalition and 41.4% for the right coalition. Indicators are in percentage points except population totals and income.

Location	Residents	Citizen adults	Left vote	Right vote	Employed	Swedish parents	Foreign heritage	Income SEK	Degree
Location			%	%					
Vidsel	1,587	1,270	59.4	39.7	77	88	12	22,114	25
Älvsbyn N	2,177	1,646	58.0	40.7	75	82	18	20,347	22
Älvsbyn V	1,992	1,518	56.5	42.9	83	90	10	25,291	23
Älvsbyn Ö	2,247	1,760	57.5	41.2	83	91	9	25,727	32
Source: SVT

== Economy ==
Two main industries in the town of Älvsbyn are AB Älvsbyhus, which builds houses, and Polarbageriet AB, which is nationally famous for their breads.

Polarbageriet has a production of about 1.5 million breads a day. They do not make loaves, but rather flat slices of a whitish bread. Their main distribution is within Sweden, but a small export goes to Finland, Denmark, the United Kingdom, Germany and France, where it is popular to use for homemade pizza.

Älvsbyhus has its base in Älvsbyn, and one of its factories there too. It is Scandinavia's biggest producer of prefabricated homes in wood. Their average production is around two houses a day, although much of the production is located at other factories closer to the market.

RFN is a government military testing facility, not just for domestic use. It is one of very few places where live missiles can be tested over land, and attracts military testers from other countries as well.

There is also some tourism, with a popular place to visit in the nature reserve Storforsen, just west of Vidsel.

== Sister cities ==
Älvsbyn Municipality has three sister cities:

- Fauske, Norway
- Haapavesi, Finland
- Monchegorsk, Russia
