= Vistträsk =

- Location within Norrbotten Location within Sweden
- Coordinates: 65°42′N 20°39′E
- Country: Sweden
- Province: Norrbotten
- County: Norrbotten County
- Municipality: Älvsbyn Municipality

Area
  - Total: 0.43 km^{2} (0.17 sq mi)

Population (31 December 2010)
  - Total: 248
  - Density: 582/km^{2} (1,510/sq mi)
- Time zone: UTC+1 (CET)
  - Summer (DST): UTC+2 (CEST)

Vistträsk (former name was Vistheden) is a locality situated in Älvsbyn Municipality, Norrbotten County, Sweden with 248 inhabitants in 2010.
