= Korsträsk =

- Location within Norrbotten Location within Sweden
- Coordinates: 65°41′N 20°53′E
- Country: Sweden
- Province: Norrbotten
- County: Norrbotten County
- Municipality: Älvsbyn Municipality

Area
  - Total: 0.73 km^{2} (0.28 sq mi)

Population (31 December 2010)
  - Total: 323
  - Density: 443/km^{2} (1,150/sq mi)
- Time zone: UTC+1 (CET)
  - Summer (DST): UTC+2 (CEST)

Korsträsk is a locality situated in Älvsbyn Municipality, Norrbotten County, Sweden with 323 inhabitants in 2010.

== Sports ==
- Korsträsks IK, sports club
