= Vidsel Air Base =

Air force base in northern Sweden

- IATA: none; ICAO: ESPE

Summary
- Airport type: Military
- Owner: Swedish Air Force
- Operator: Swedish Air Force
- Location: Myrheden, Sweden
- Built: 1957
- In use: 1957–present
- Commander: LtCol Mats Hakkarainen
- Elevation AMSL: 597 ft (182 m)
- Coordinates: 65°52′31″N 020°09′00″E
- Interactive map of Vidsel Air Base

Runways
Direction	Length		Surface
Direction	ft	m	Surface
11/29	7,320	2,230	Asphalt
12/30	2,625	800	Asphalt
12/30	2,625	800	Asphalt

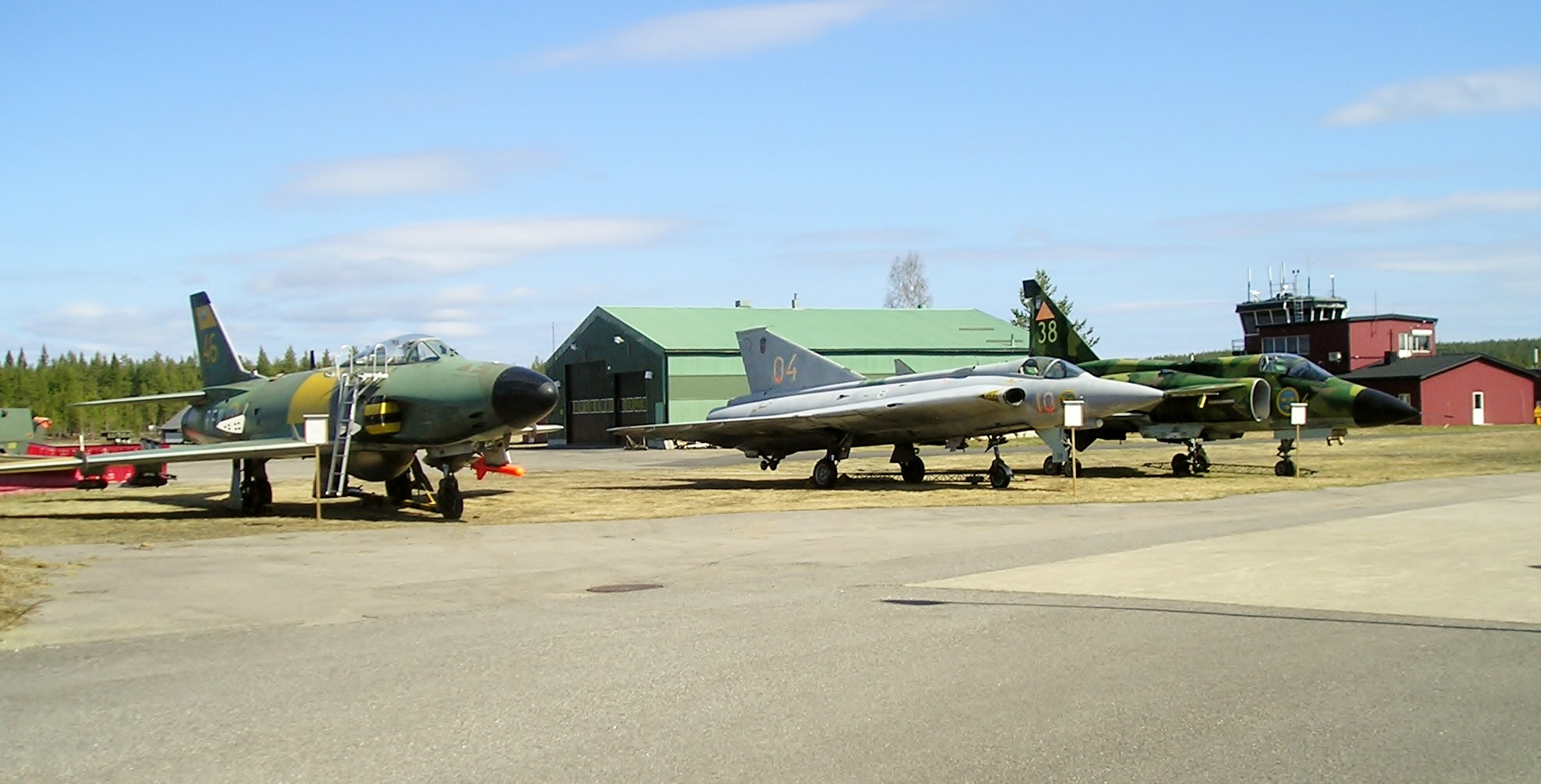

Vidsel Air Base (ICAO: ESPE) is a Swedish Air Force airfield located 15 km west-northwest of the town of Vidsel, in Sweden. It is a critical part of Vidsel Test Range that provides an aerospace test and evaluation asset for Sweden through the Test & Evaluation (T&E) department of Swedish Defence Materiel Administration (FMV).

The Swedish Armed Forces, 21st Air Force Wing is the proprietor of the Air Base. By contract between SAF and FMV, FMV T&E use the base as part of the Vidsel Test Range. SAF is responsible for keeping Vidsel Air Base in operational status and that the airport related activities are carried out in accordance with Swedish military regulations.

The airfield is located in the south-east corner of Vidsel Test Range, which is a missile test range consisting of 7,200 km^{2} restricted airspace and 3,300 km^{2} restricted ground space.

There is operational support staff at Vidsel Air Base supporting airfield ops at all times.

== Facilities ==
=== Runways ===
There are four runways belonging to the base, of which three are operational.

==== Main runway ====
- RWY A - 11/29, L: 2230 m (7320 ft), W: 35 m (115 ft)

==== Short runways ====
- RWY B - 11/29, L: 800 m (2625 ft), W: 17 m (60 ft) (not in operation)
- RWY C - 12/30, L: 800 m (2625 ft), W: 17 m (60 ft)
- RWY D - 12/30, L: 800 m (2625 ft), W: 17 m (60 ft)

=== Aprons ===
There are 17 apron areas at the base. The largest are:

- A2 (2,974 m^{2})
- A5 (1,800 m^{2})
- A85 (2,175 m^{2})
- A86 (1,925 m^{2})

There are also 13 smaller aprons, all approx. 400 m^{2}, suitable for single military fast jets.

=== Hangars ===
There are two hangars at the air base, both mainly used for the operations at Vidsel Test Range.
The larger one is 1800 m^{2}, and can house several military style fast jets.
The smaller one is 850 m^{2}, divided in two parts, and can house two military style fast jets.

=== Shelters ===
There are four shelters for military style fast jets at the air base.

=== Arresting gear ===
The airfield is fitted with a NATO standard arrestor cable system, as well as Swedish standard arresting net.

== Civil use ==
For normal air force operational reasons, civilian aircraft are generally not given permission to use the airfield unless such use is related to defence activities.

== History ==
Vidsel Air Base was established as a secret wartime air base by the Swedish Air Force in 1957. It was called "Krigsflygfält nr. 42" (Wartime airbase no. 42) and not put on maps or written about. The majority of work at the base was done by personnel from the Test & Evaluation department of Swedish Defence Materiel Administration (FMV).

The use of the base was both as a dispersed airbase in case of war, and for the newly established Vidsel Test Range.

The secrecy of the base was lifted in 1965, with foreign aircraft using the base from 1966, though very sparsely.

During the 70's the use of the base for training of Swedish Air Force crews increased steadily, and more and more of the operations was taken over by personnel from the 21st wing. In 1980 all training for the Swedish Air Force in north Sweden was moved to Vidsel Air Base.

Vidsel Air Base was completed as a Bas 90 airbase in 1989, meaning that apart from a main runway three shorter runways had been added together with other facilities.

== Aircraft operated ==
Vidsel Air Base is able to operate all current types of aircraft used by the Swedish AF, as well as a number of other aircraft from other users, including many NATO, as the airfield is equipped with an arresting wire.

The following aircraft have operated from Vidsel Air Base:
(Note, list not complete.)

=== Jet aircraft ===
- SAAB J 29 Tunnan
- SAAB J 32 Lansen
- SAAB J 35 Draken
- SAAB J 37 Viggen
- SAAB JAS 39 Gripen
- SAAB 105 / Sk 60
- De Havilland Venom
- Northrop F-5 Tiger
- Lockheed Martin F-16 Fighting Falcon
- McDonnell Douglas F-18 Hornet
- Panavia Tornado
- Mirage III
- Mirage 2000
- Hawker Hunter
- Eurofighter Typhoon

=== Other aircraft ===
- Bristol Bulldog
- Caravelle
- C-130 Hercules
- DC-3
- C-160 Transall

=== Helicopters ===
- Tiger
- Mi-28
- AH-64D Apache
- Bell 206 Jet Ranger
- Alouette II
- Alouette III
- Agusta Bell 204
- AS532 Cougar
