= Lake Immeln =

Lake in Östra Göinge Municipality, Sweden

Immeln
- Lake
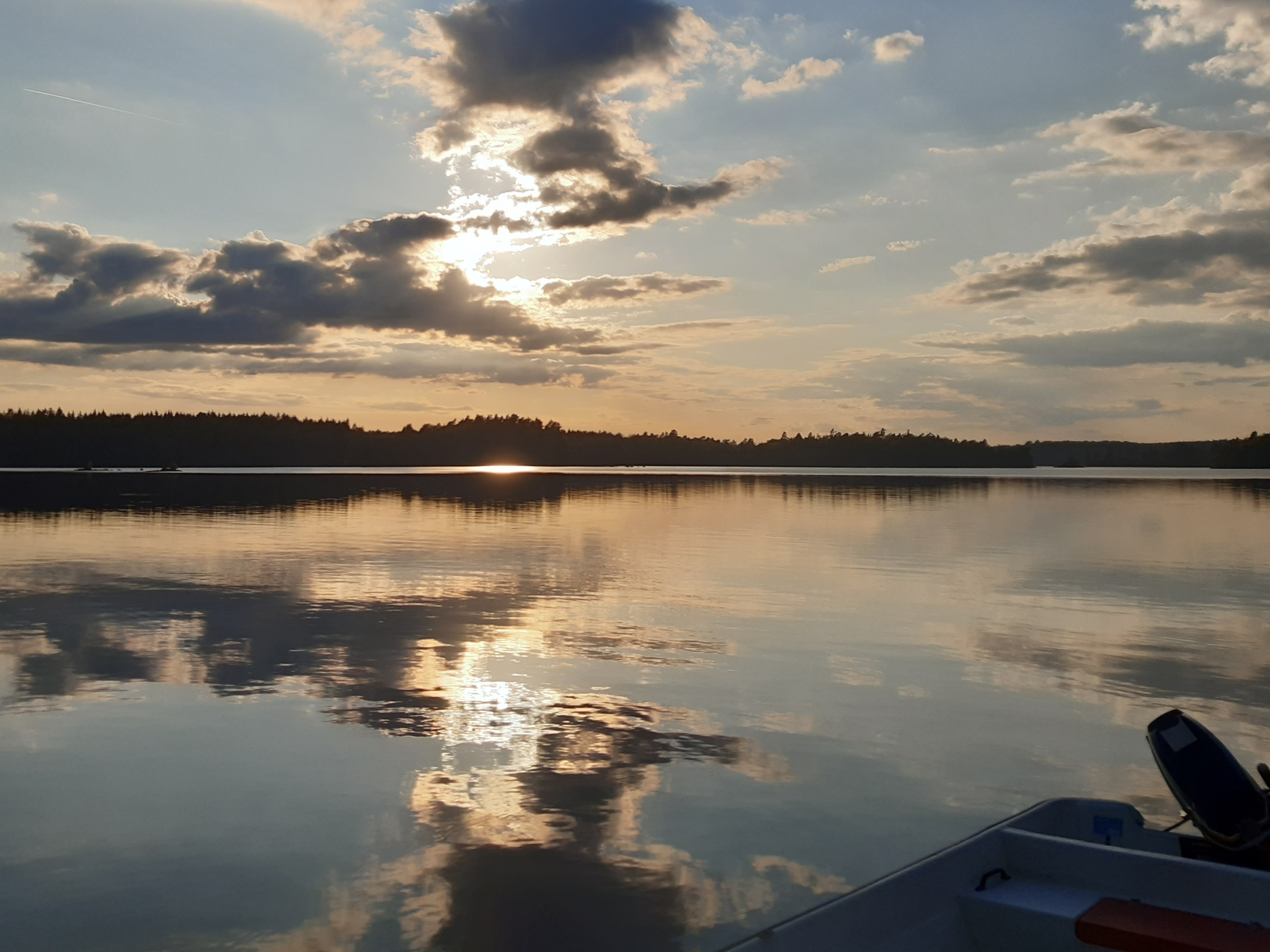
- Immeln July, 2019
- Interactive map of Immeln
- Location: Sweden
- Coordinates: 59°15′15.48″N 14°19′27.48″E
- Part of: South Baltic Sea Water District
- Surface area: 22.4 km^{2} (8.6 sq mi)
- Surface elevation: 81.1 m (266 ft)

Immeln is a lake located in the municipalities of Kristianstad, Osby, and Östra Göinge in Skåne and is part of the main catchment area of Skräbeån. The lake is 28 meters deep, has an area of 22.4 square kilometers, and has an elevation of 81.1 meters above sea level. The lake drains via Lillån to Holjeån through Ivösjön and finally to the Baltic Sea through Skräbeån. During test fishing, perch, bream, gers and pike have been caught in the lake.

Immeln is home to the communities of Immeln, Breanäs and Mjönäs. It is Skåne's third largest lake. The lake has its outlet through Edre stream in the northeast and there is a dam where the runoff can be regulated. It is also mentioned in literature by Harry Martinson, among others.

== Nature ==
Immeln is nutrient-poor, and its shores are often rocky and lined with forests. There are plenty of islands here, some of which serve as bird sanctuaries. Among the larger islands are Tjärön, Vejlön, and Högön. Water caltrop used to exist in Immeln until the beginning of the 20th century. The lake is home to a downstream-spawning trout called Immelnöring. A few specimens of red water lilies grow in the lake. The last known catch of a catfish in the lake was in 1974. In the eastern part of the lake lies the Brotorpet Nature Reserve. To the north of Immeln is Nytebodaskogen, a nature reserve with old coniferous forests. The forest in the reserve has been severely affected by insect pests.

== History ==
The lake is depicted on Gerhard Buhrmann's map of Skåne from 1684 as immel siö. It appears that the name was previously spelled with an extra "e" (Immelen). Today, people sometimes say "Immelsjön" to distinguish the lake from the village of the same name. In 1750, Carl Hårleman presented a proposal for a canal connection from the Småland border via River Helge and over Immeln down to Kristianstad. In 1753, he had his proposal printed, but it never gained any traction.

In 1844, a proposal was made to lower the water level of Immeln in order to gain agricultural land. Long processes followed, but no lake lowering ever took place. At the beginning of the 20th century, there were renewed attempts, which again did not lead to any results.

In 1885 the Kristianstad-Immelns Railway was inaugurated, which led the shore owners around the lake to form a steamboat company Immelns Ångslups AB for traffic on the lake. Mostly barge traffic with timber and firewood, but there was also passenger traffic. After the opening of the Sölvesborg-Olofström-Älmhult Railway, however, the number of passengers decreased and in 1926 the traffic was discontinued. Barge traffic across the lake continued, however, until the 1930s with stones from Rörvik to Immeln station and with wood until 1946 when the last barges were lowered into the bay at Dönaberga. Harry Martinson's parents lived in Nyteboda near Immeln, where his father was a merchant, and he describes the lake in Flowering Nettle as Elmen.

== Outdoor activities ==
A canoe trail runs through the lake and extends into the lakes Filkesjön, Raslången and Halen. Canoe livery is available in the town of Immeln, in Olofström, and at Brotorpet, the northern part of Lake Immeln.

== Sub-catchment area ==
Immeln is part of the sub-basin (624206–141214) referred to by SMHI as the Immeln outlet. The average altitude is 99 meters above sea level and the area is 93.37 square kilometers. If the 13 upstream river basins are included, the cumulative area is 275 square kilometers. The catchment's outflow, Skräbeån (Alltidhultsån), flows into the sea. The catchment area consists mostly of forest (64%). The catchment area has 23.59 square kilometres of water surface, giving it a lake percentage of 25.2%. The settlements in the area cover an area of 0.6 square kilometers, representing 1% of the catchment area.

== Fish ==
The following fish have been caught in the lake:

- European perch
- Bream
- Ruffe
- Pike
- Bleak
- Roach
- Rudd
- Lavaret
- Tench
