= Storforsen =

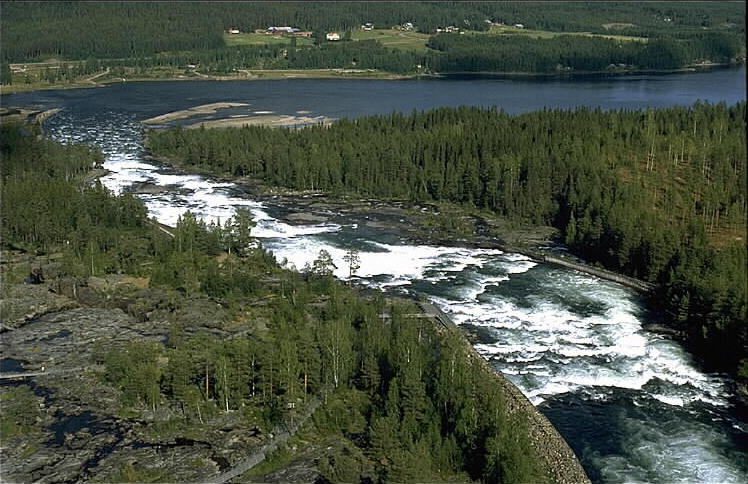
- Storforsen in August 1994
- Interactive map of Storforsen
- Location: Norrbottens län, Sweden
- Coordinates: 65°51′05″N 20°24′36″E
- Type: Gradual sliding cascade
- Total height: 35 m (115 ft)
- Number of drops: 1
- Longest drop: 35 m (115 ft)
- Total width: 366 m (1,201 ft)
- Average width: 76 m (249 ft)
- Run: 686 m (2,251 ft)
- Watercourse: Pite River
- Average flow rate: 187 m^{3}/s (6,600 cu ft/s)

Storforsen is a waterfall on the Pite River in Swedish Norrbottens län is located approximately 38 km northwest of Älvsbyn. With an average flow of 187 m^{3}/s, the rapids are one of the most voluminous in Europe. The rapids stretch over a distance of 5 km in which it drops 82 meters 60 of which are a single waterfall.

Flow usually is highest at midsummer: 870 m^{3}/s. During the floodyear 1995 a volume of 1200 cubic metres flowed down Storforsen each second.

To prevent accidents the rocks surrounding the rapids are fenced, views being readily accessible to the public via ramps. While the rapids were used in previous years to transport logs, today its surroundings are part of a nature park, visited by 150,000 people each year.

== Image gallery ==
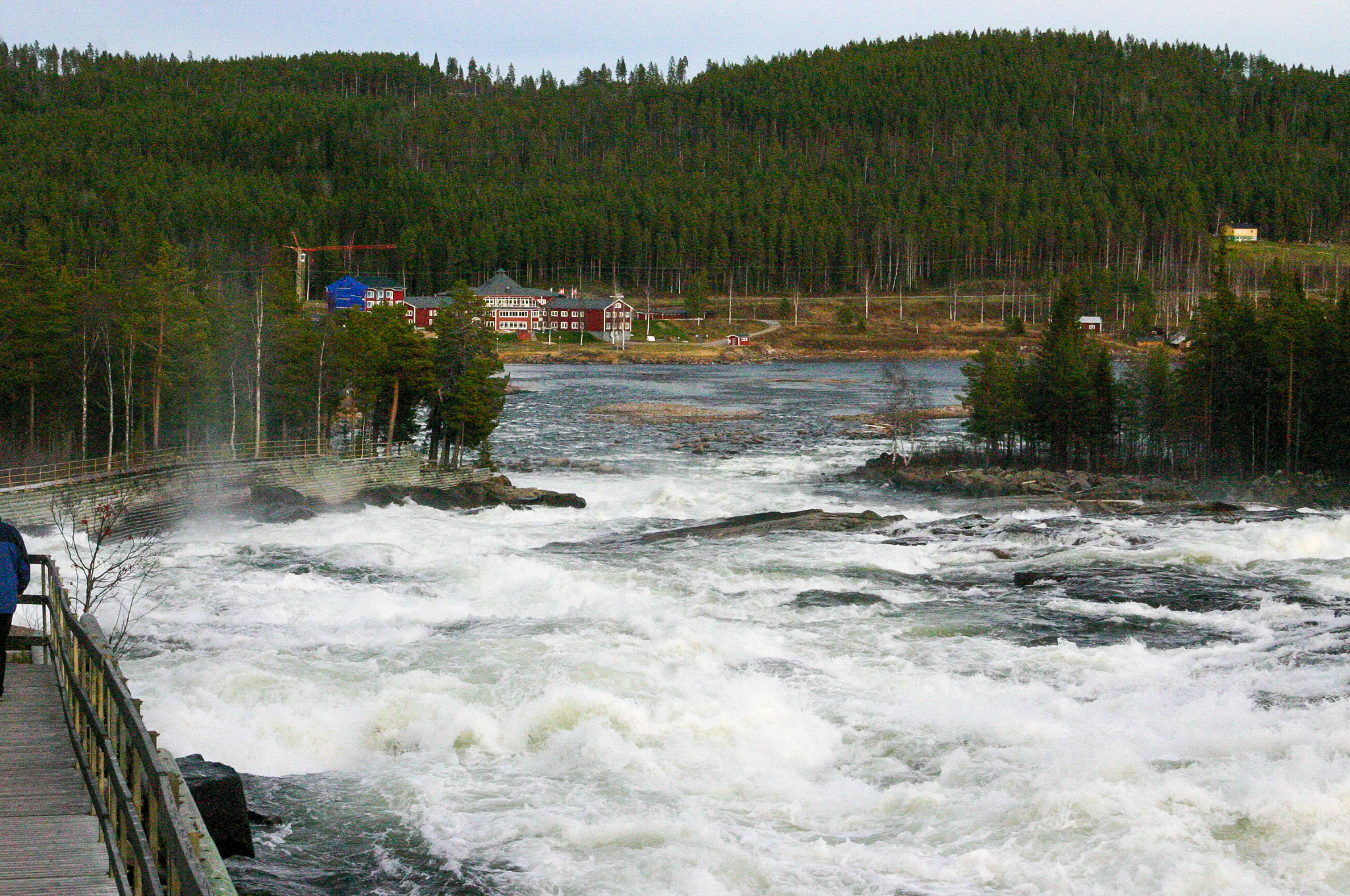

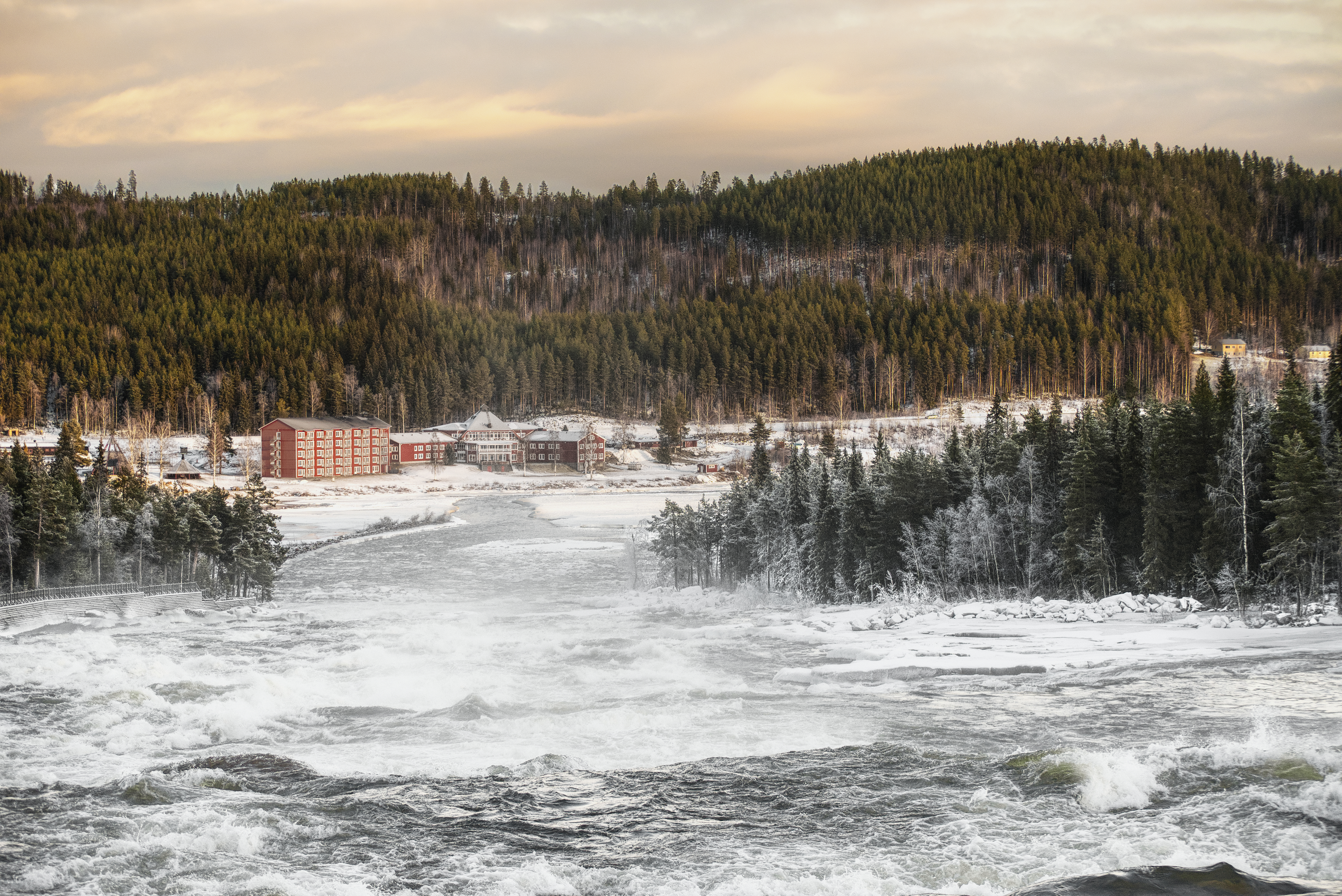

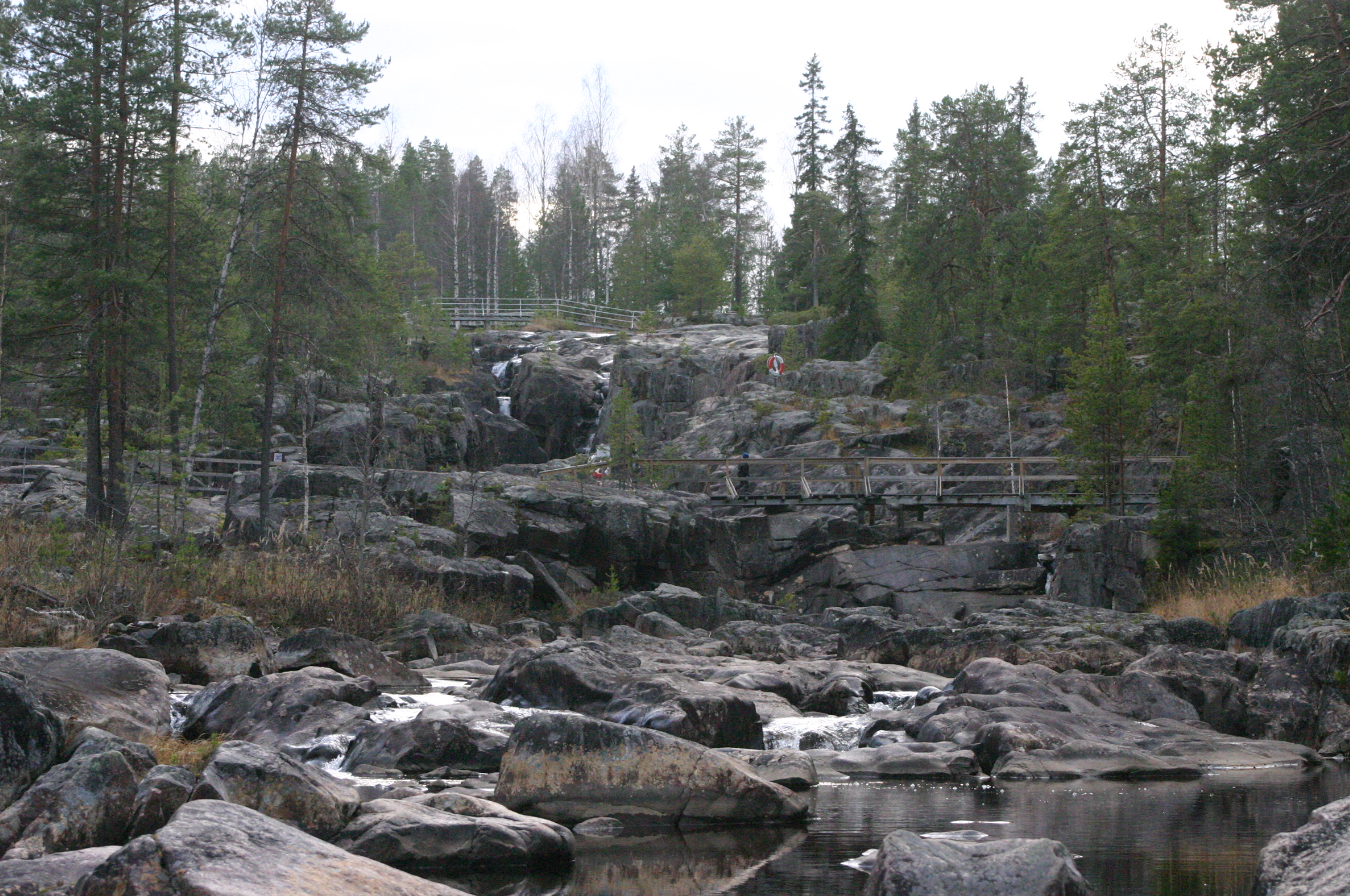

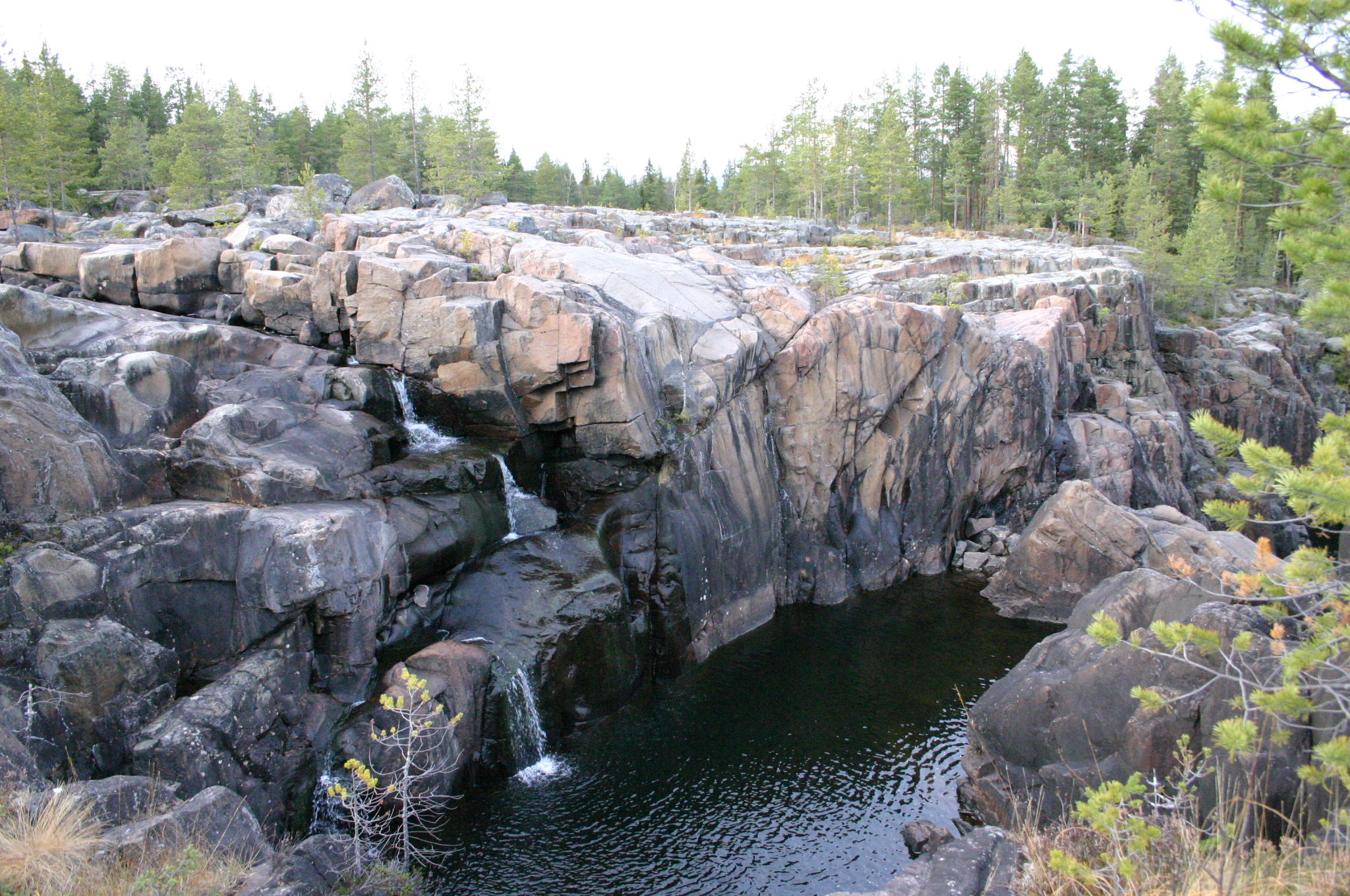

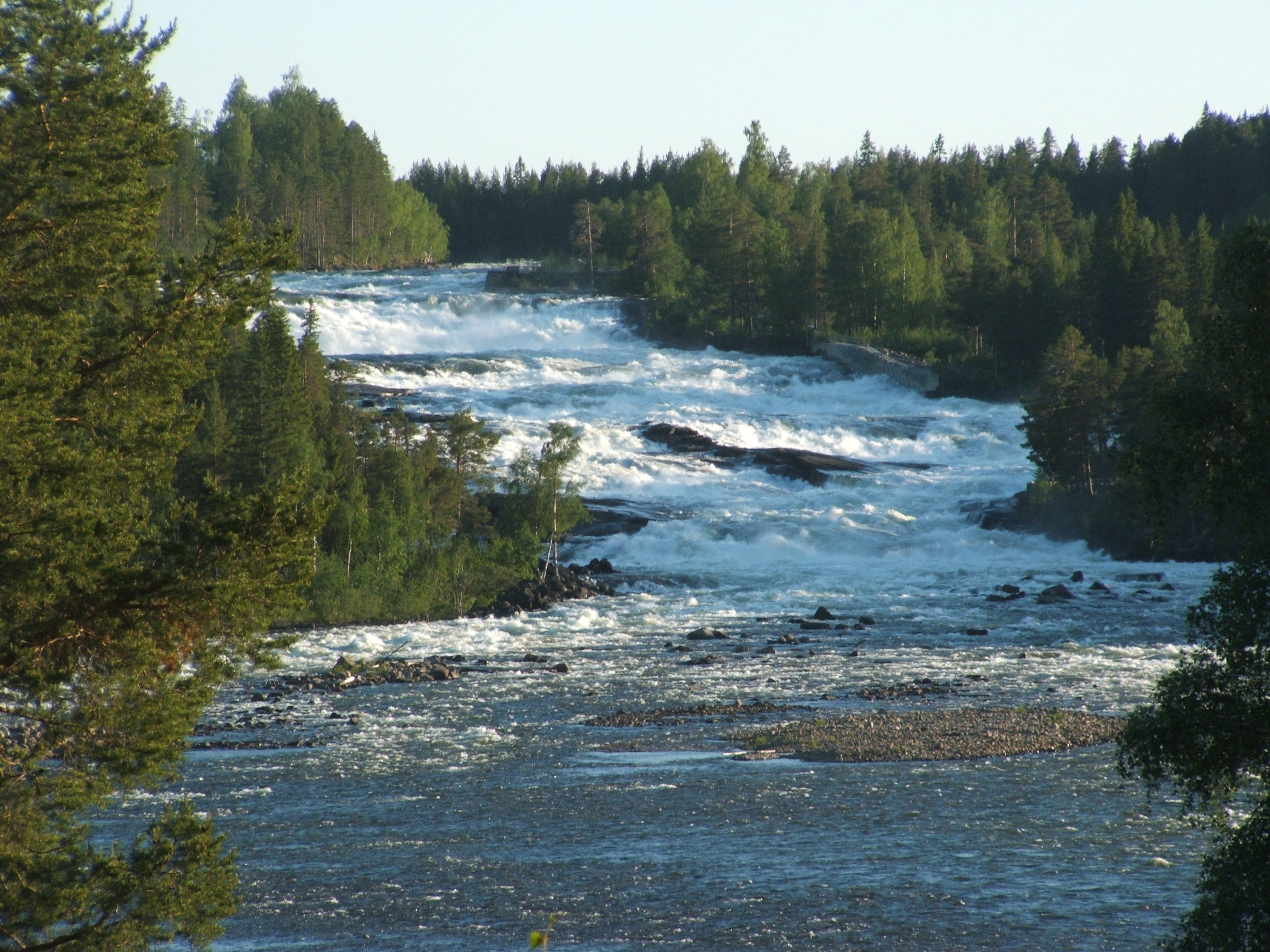

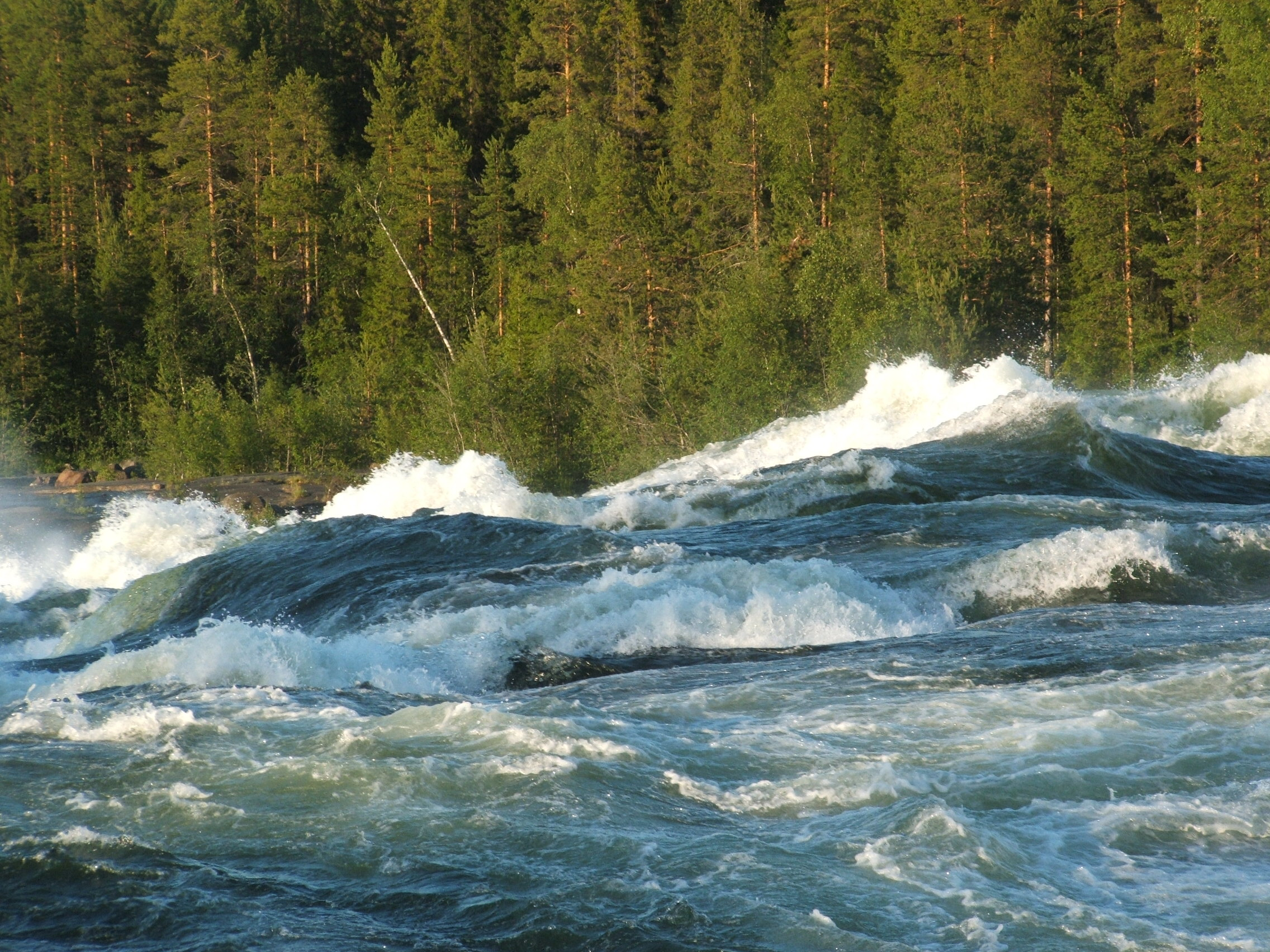

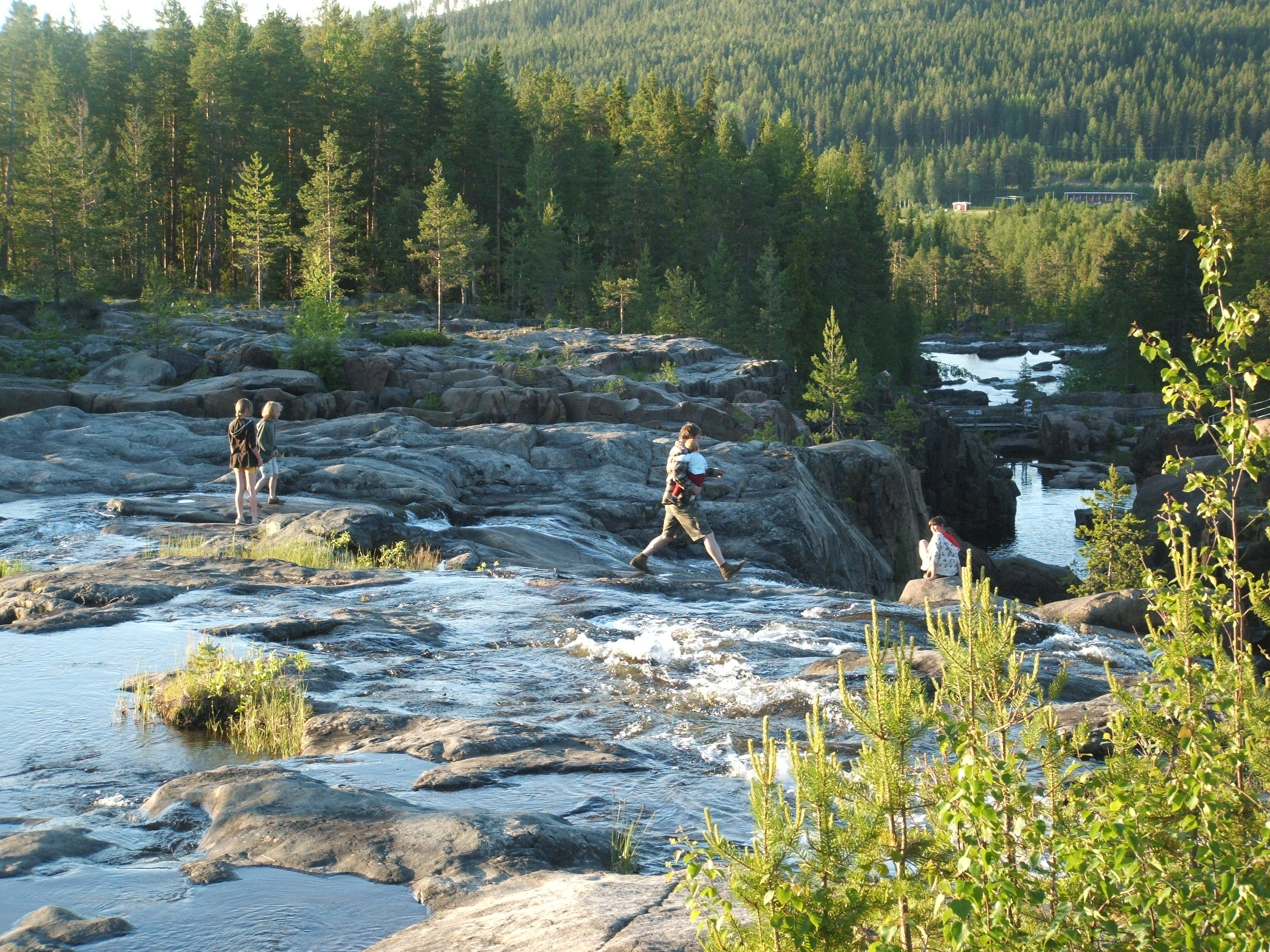

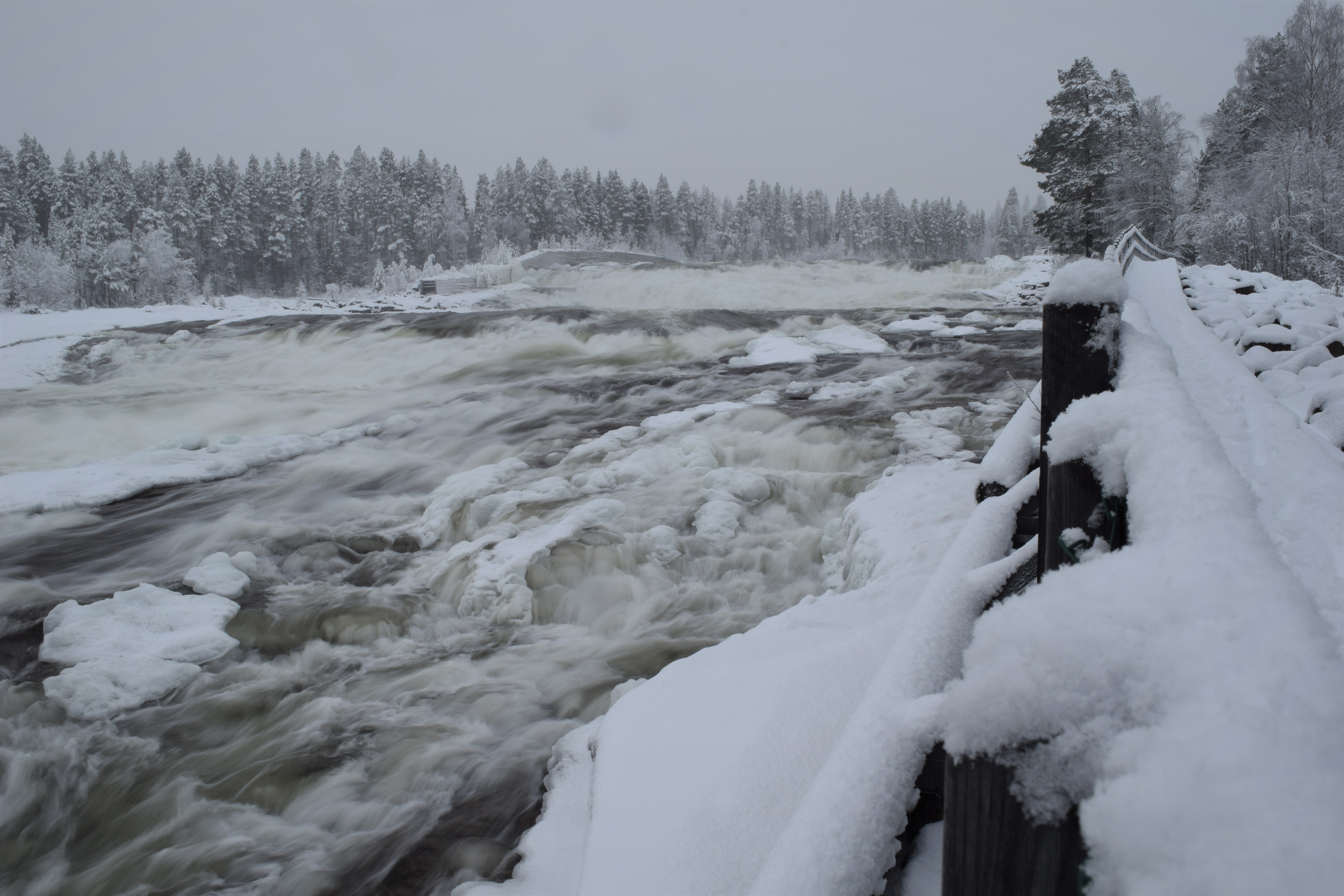

== See also ==
- List of waterfalls
- List of waterfalls by flow rate
