= Alkvettern =

Lake in Sweden

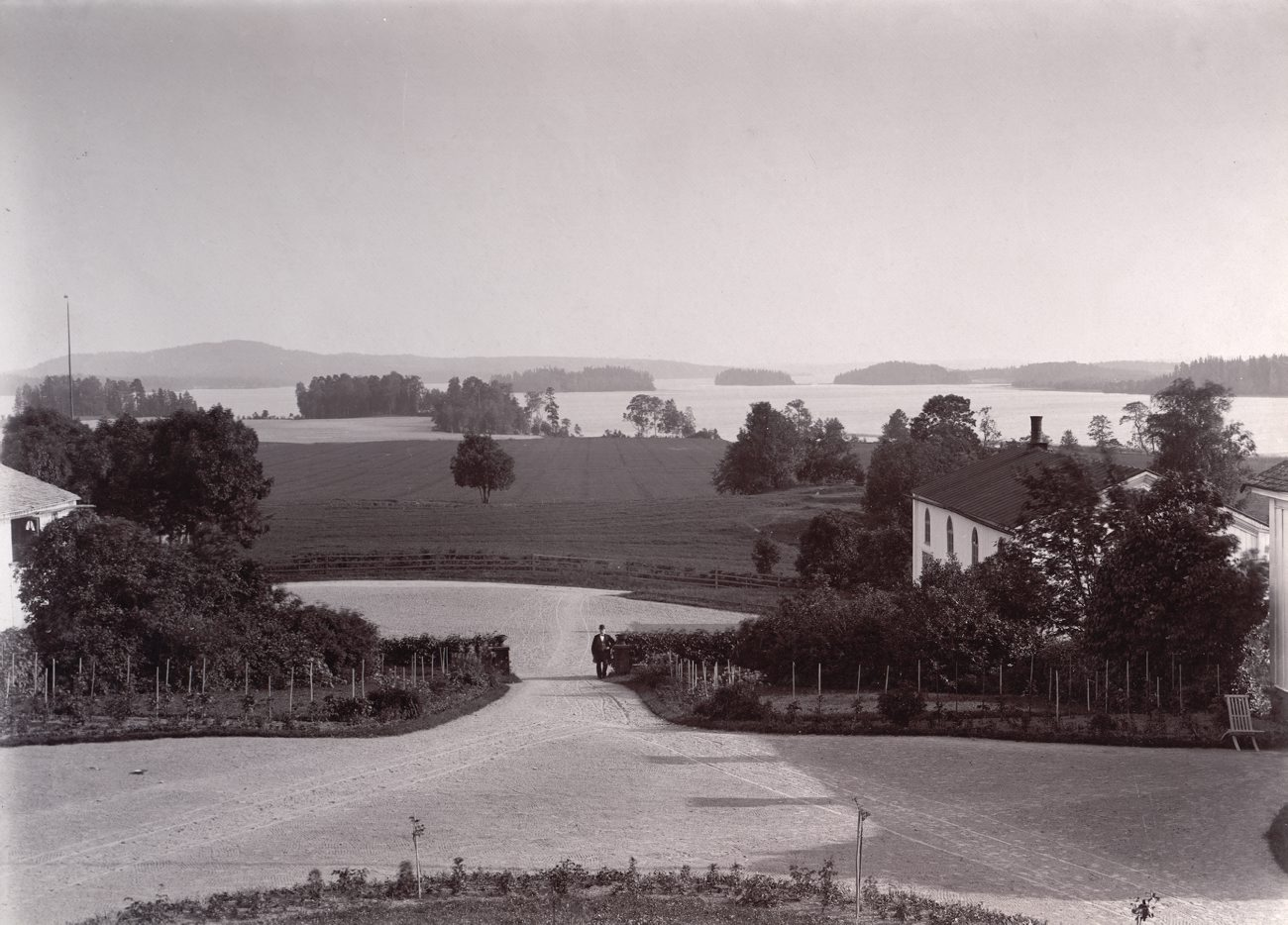
- Distant view of lake

- Location within Sweden
- Coordinates: 59°23′24″N 14°23′06″E
- Basin countries: Sweden
- Surface area: 16.8 km^{2} (6.5 sq mi)
- Max. depth: 21 m (69 ft)
- Surface elevation: 112 m (367 ft)

Alkvettern (Swedish pronunciation: [ˈâlkˌvɛʈːɛɳ]) is a lake in Sweden.

It is situated in the historical province of Värmland in the southwest of the country. The lake, with a surface elevation of 112 metres (367 ft), spans two counties: Örebro and Värmland.

== See also ==
- Lakes of Sweden
