= Älvsbyn =

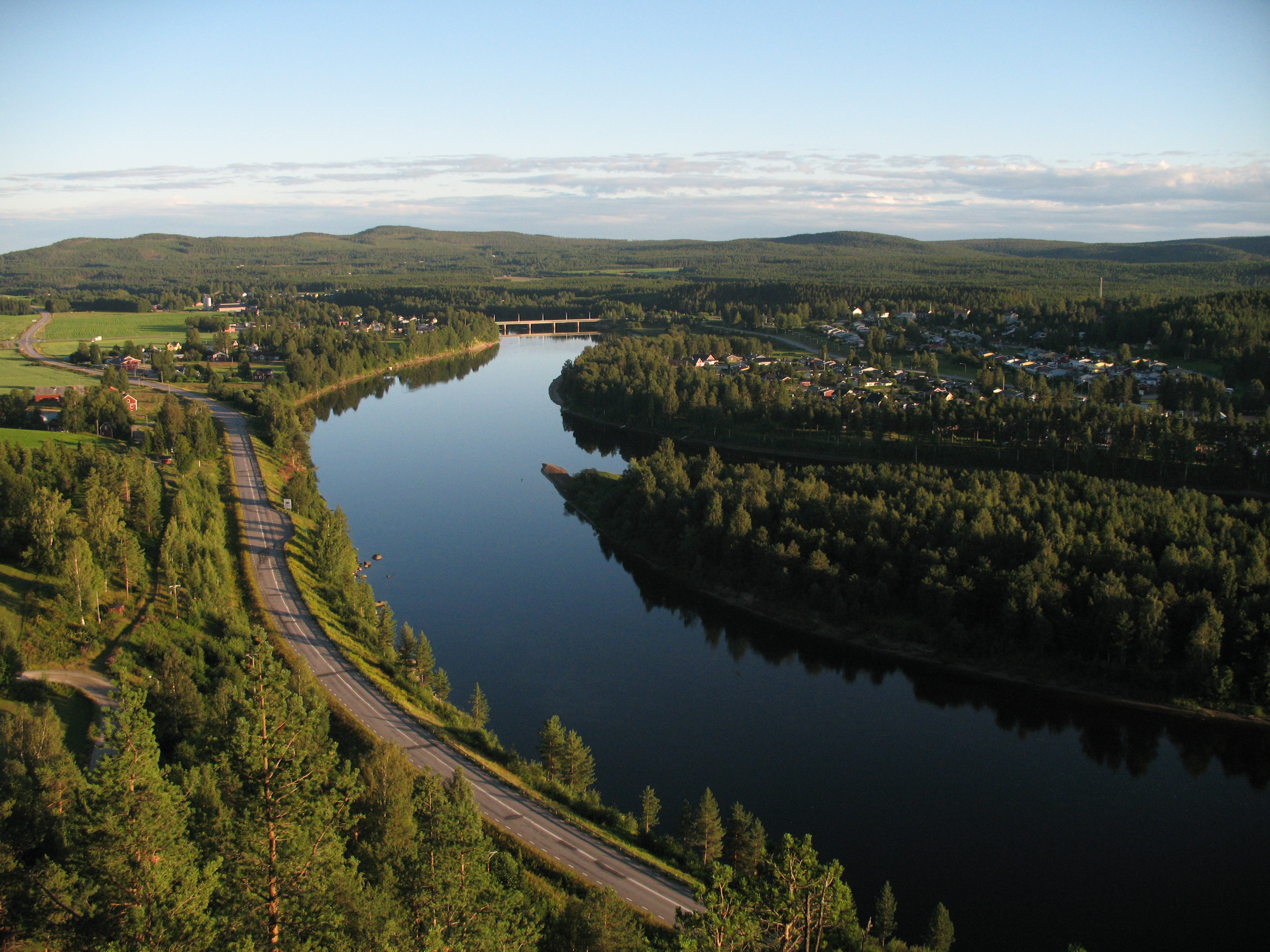
- 2007 view from Hundberget ("Dog Mountain").

- Location within Norrbotten Location within Sweden
- Coordinates: 65°41′N 21°01′E
- Country: Sweden
- Province: Norrbotten
- County: Norrbotten County
- Municipality: Älvsbyn Municipality

Area
  - Total: 6.35 km^{2} (2.45 sq mi)

Population (31 December 2010)
  - Total: 4,967
  - Density: 782/km^{2} (2,030/sq mi)
- Time zone: UTC+1 (CET)
  - Summer (DST): UTC+2 (CEST)
- Website: www.alvsbyn.se

Älvsbyn (Swedish pronunciation: [ˈɛ̌lvsbʏn]; translating to "the river village") is a locality and the seat of Älvsbyn Municipality in Norrbotten County, Sweden with 4,967 inhabitants in 2010. It is known as "The Pearl of Norrbotten".

Älvsbyn has a railway station that is served by trains running between Boden and Stockholm along the Swedish east coast. It has a youth hostel with a small recreational park, including a swimming pool.

== Climate ==
Älvsbyn is as its name suggest located right on the Pite River. Being in a relatively deep valley by Swedish standards, the location is prone to temperature inversion. As a result, diurnal temperature variation is usually high and winter nights can be extremely cold and average near the coldest among Swedish municipal seats. Under the Köppen system, Älvsbyn has a subarctic climate with four pronounced seasons. The inland location warms summer up compared to coastal areas nearby, whereas winters are highly variable depending on wind patterns.

Climate data for Älvsbyn (2002–2021 averages, extremes since 1964)
Month	Jan	Feb	Mar	Apr	May	Jun	Jul	Aug	Sep	Oct	Nov	Dec	Year
Record high °C (°F)	9.0 (48.2)	9.5 (49.1)	14.4 (57.9)	21.0 (69.8)	29.5 (85.1)	32.2 (90.0)	32.7 (90.9)	31.4 (88.5)	26.4 (79.5)	21.8 (71.2)	12.4 (54.3)	9.2 (48.6)	32.7 (90.9)
Mean maximum °C (°F)	4.1 (39.4)	5.6 (42.1)	8.9 (48.0)	15.5 (59.9)	24.0 (75.2)	26.0 (78.8)	28.0 (82.4)	26.6 (79.9)	20.9 (69.6)	13.5 (56.3)	7.1 (44.8)	5.0 (41.0)	29.3 (84.7)
Mean daily maximum °C (°F)	−6.9 (19.6)	−5.1 (22.8)	1.3 (34.3)	7.2 (45.0)	14.0 (57.2)	18.9 (66.0)	21.9 (71.4)	19.5 (67.1)	13.9 (57.0)	5.7 (42.3)	−0.9 (30.4)	−4.0 (24.8)	7.1 (44.8)
Daily mean °C (°F)	−12.4 (9.7)	−11.2 (11.8)	−5.2 (22.6)	1.3 (34.3)	7.5 (45.5)	12.6 (54.7)	15.6 (60.1)	13.4 (56.1)	8.5 (47.3)	1.5 (34.7)	−4.9 (23.2)	−8.9 (16.0)	1.5 (34.7)
Mean daily minimum °C (°F)	−17.9 (−0.2)	−17.2 (1.0)	−11.7 (10.9)	−4.6 (23.7)	0.9 (33.6)	6.2 (43.2)	9.2 (48.6)	7.3 (45.1)	3.0 (37.4)	−2.8 (27.0)	−8.9 (16.0)	−13.8 (7.2)	−4.2 (24.5)
Mean minimum °C (°F)	−33.4 (−28.1)	−32.4 (−26.3)	−28.2 (−18.8)	−15.6 (3.9)	−5.7 (21.7)	−1.2 (29.8)	2.1 (35.8)	−0.5 (31.1)	−5.0 (23.0)	−15.1 (4.8)	−22.2 (−8.0)	−28.8 (−19.8)	−35.9 (−32.6)
Record low °C (°F)	−44.5 (−48.1)	−44.0 (−47.2)	−34.4 (−29.9)	−26.1 (−15.0)	−9.6 (14.7)	−4.6 (23.7)	0.0 (32.0)	−3.6 (25.5)	−10.2 (13.6)	−26.3 (−15.3)	−32.7 (−26.9)	−39.0 (−38.2)	−44.5 (−48.1)
Average precipitation mm (inches)	31.8 (1.25)	23.1 (0.91)	20.7 (0.81)	21.0 (0.83)	37.3 (1.47)	56.0 (2.20)	69.5 (2.74)	67.8 (2.67)	56.5 (2.22)	41.9 (1.65)	35.9 (1.41)	36.4 (1.43)	497.9 (19.59)
Source 1: SMHI Open Data for Älvsbyn, precipitation
Source 2: SMHI Open Data for Älvsbyn, temperature

== Sports ==
The following sports clubs are located in Älvsbyn:

- Älvsby IF
