= Vidsel Test Range =

Proving ground in Sweden

- Near Vidsel in Sweden
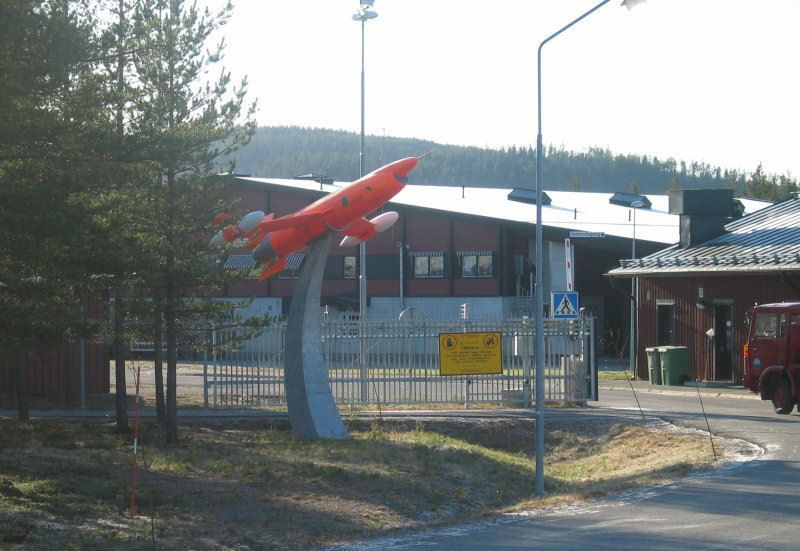
- An old target missile (RB 02) displayed at the entrance to the Vidsel Test Range

Site information
- Type: Aerospace (military/civil)
- Operator: Swedish Defence Materiel Administration
- Status: Active

Location
- Coordinates: 65°52′50.3″N 20°6′59.5″E

Site history
- In use: 1958–present

Vidsel Test Range is a Swedish strategic national test and evaluation asset operated by the Swedish Defence Materiel Administration (FMV), a part of the Swedish Ministry of Defence, near Vidsel.

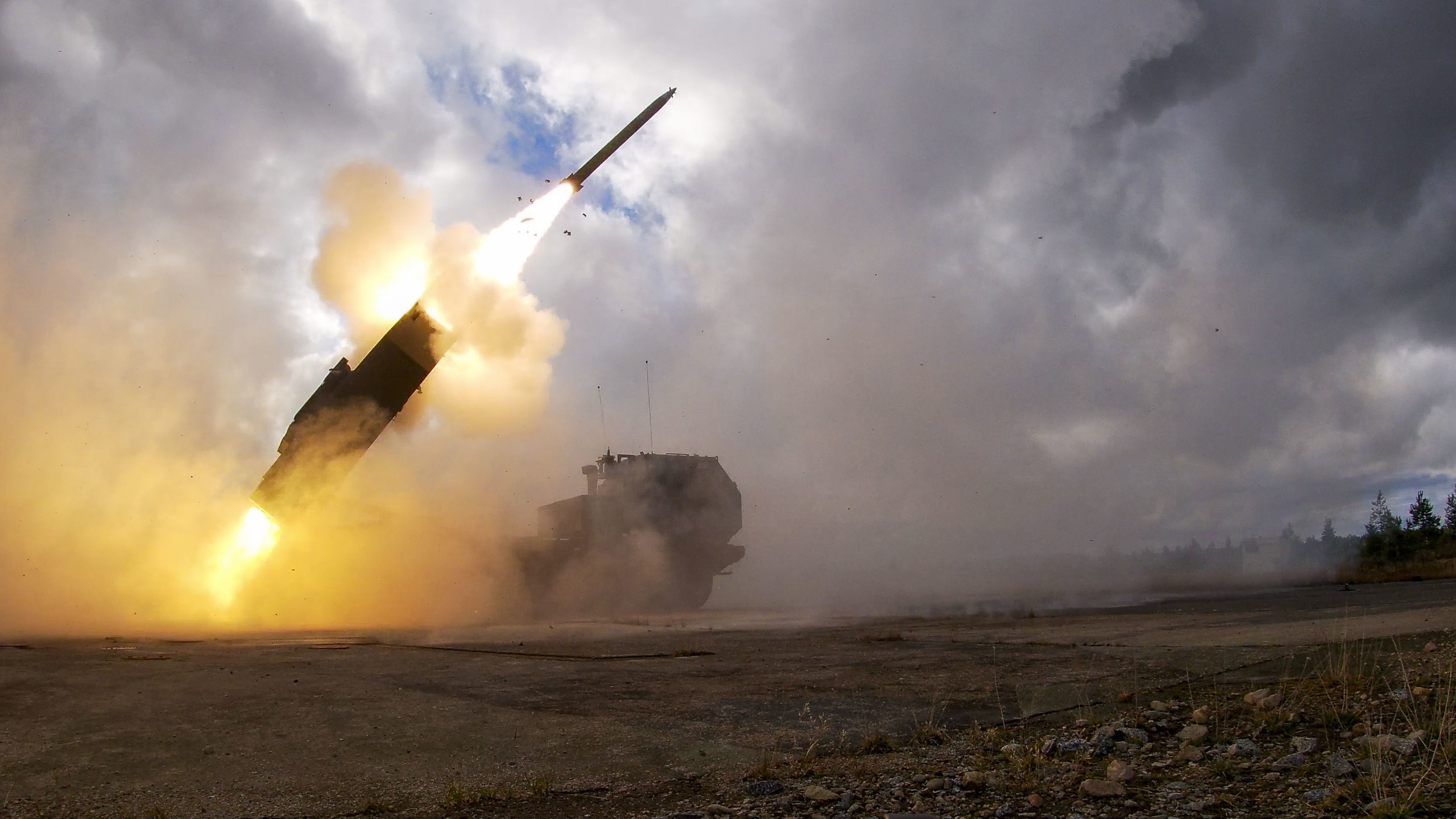
A US M142 HIMARS fires a missile at Vidsel during an exercise.

== Physical attributes ==
Vidsel Test Range is located in the north of Sweden, in a region with an extremely low population and little air-traffic.

=== Restricted airspace ===
Vidsel Test Range has a permanently restricted airspace, called R02 in the Swedish system.

It covers the suspended ground space and is 7,200 km^{2} in size, with GND/UNL altitude restriction.

=== Suspended ground-space ===
Vidsel Test Range has a 3,300 km^{2} large ground area, that is prohibited to enter for non-authorized personnel.

1,600 km^{2} is the original test area established 1958, and is suspended year-around.
1,700 km^{2} (divided in one 1600 km^{2} and one 100 km^{2} part) is only used and suspended when special demands calls for a larger area. The extended range can be used Sept-Jun.

=== Local impacts ===
There are uncertainties and critique regarding negative impacts for the local environment and population, including the indigenous population of Sámi people and their herding of reindeers.

== See also ==
- Vidsel Air Base
- North European Aerospace Test range
