= Korsträsks IK =

Swedish sports club

Korsträsk IK
- Full name: Korsträsk idrottsklubb
- Sport: soccer
- Founded: 2 January 1932
- Based in: Korsträsk, Sweden

Korsträsk IK is a sports club in Korsträsk, Sweden.

The women's soccer team played three seasons in the Swedish top division between 1979 and 1981.
