= Hornavan =

Lake in Arjeplog Municipality, Norrbotten County, Sweden

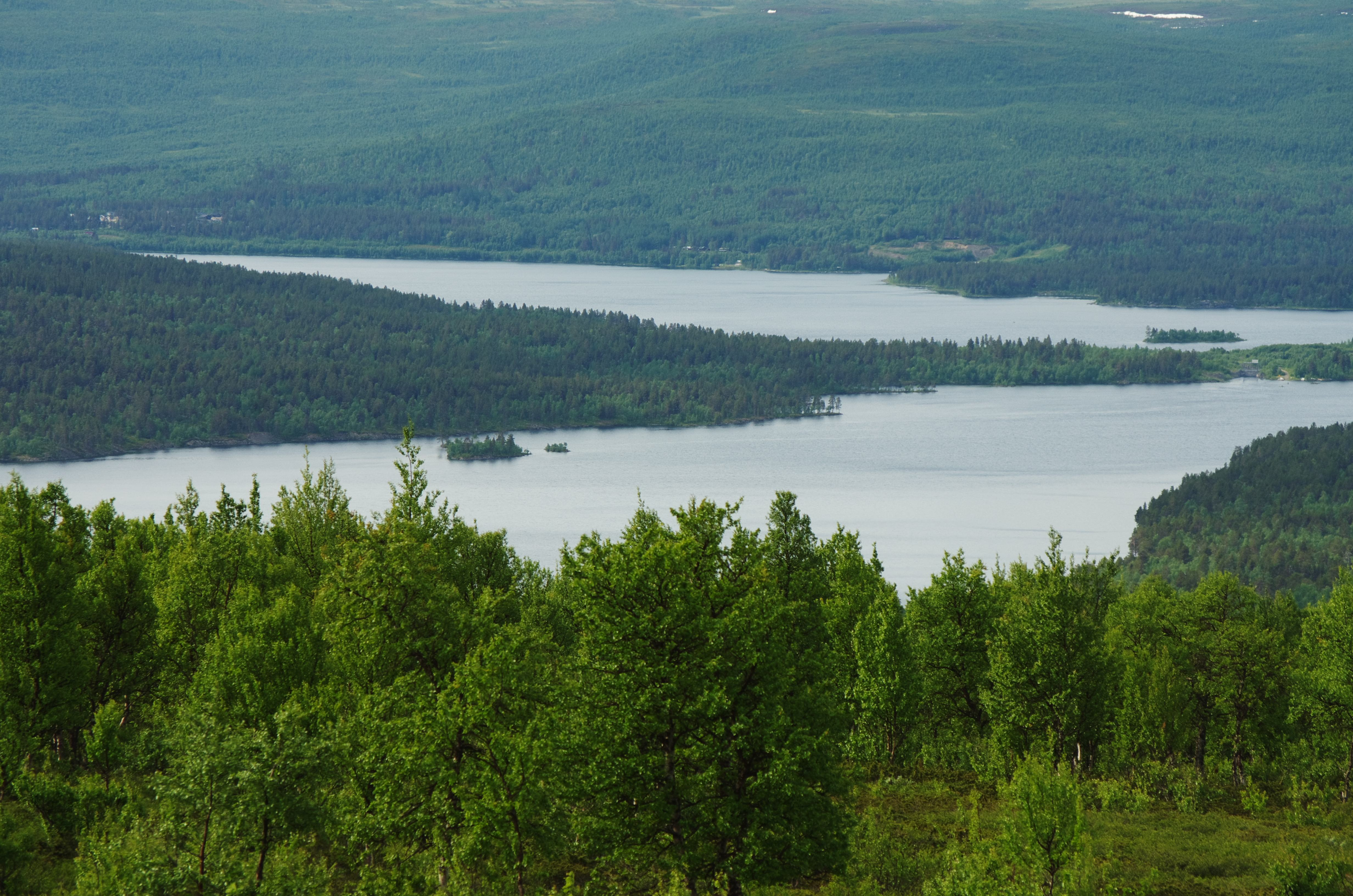
- The north-western part of the lake

- Hornavan in Sweden

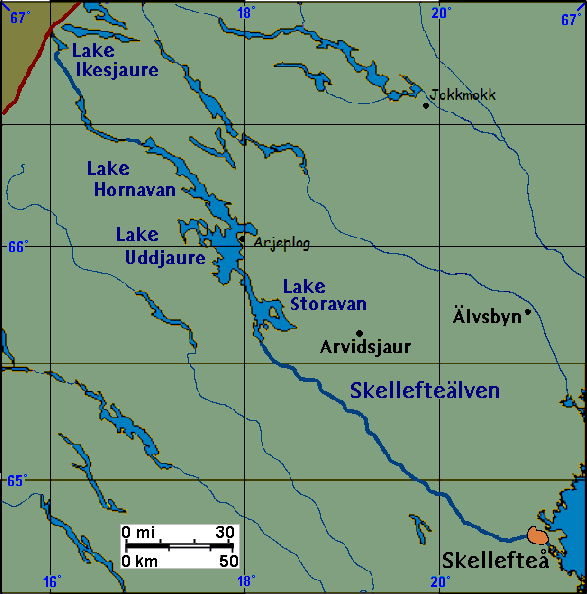
- Map of Lake Hornavan (upper left) in Sweden
- Location: Swedish Lapland
- Coordinates: 66°14′N 17°30′E
- Basin countries: Sweden
- Surface area: 252 km^{2} (97 sq mi)
- Max. depth: 221 m (725 ft)
- Surface elevation: 425 m (1,394 ft)
- Islands: 400 islets
- Settlements: Arjeplog, Jäckvik

Hornavan is a lake in northern Sweden. Located in Arjeplog Municipality in the province of Swedish Lapland, administratively known as Norrbotten County, it is the deepest lake in Sweden at 221 metres (725 ft). Being a high mountain lake downstream from the source of the Skellefte River, the deepest point of the lake basin is still located 204 metres (669 ft) above sea level. Due to the cold subarctic climate of the area, it always freezes over for several months of the year in spite of its depth.

== Geography ==
It is situated in the Scandinavian mountain range, at a height of 425 metres (1,394 ft). The town of Arjeplog is located on its south-western shore. The lake then extends 70 km (43 mi) northwest up to the town of Jäckvik, containing about 400 islets, many of which have distinguishable flora and fauna. Research on the ecosystems comparing the larger islands with smaller islets in Hornavan and Uddjaur are popular due to their unpolluted environment, and have yielded rewarding results. In June 2005 an international study was published in Nature entitled Effects of species and functional group loss on island ecosystem properties.

On its southern end, the lake attaches with the lake Uddjaure.

The surface area fluctuates between 220 and 283 km^{2} (85 and 109 sq mi), but some sources give it as constant 251 km^{2} (97 sq mi); in any case, it is the eighth largest lake in Sweden. With a largest depth of 221 metres (725 ft) it is also the deepest.

The lake has been cultivated for water power. Hornavan, like all lakes in Arjeplog Municipality, has drinkable water.

== Fishing ==
Hornavan has 5 native species of whitefish: Coregonus pallasii, Coregonus megalops, Coregonus maxillaris, Coregonus nelssonii and Coregonus widegreni (the latter known under the name Valaam), with a sixth, Coregonus maraena, introduced in the 1940s. Trolling for trout in the lake is also popular.

== Sources ==
- (in Swedish) Allmänt om Arjeplog Arjeplog Official Site
