= Kedträsket =

Lake in Norsjö Municipality, Sweden

- Lake
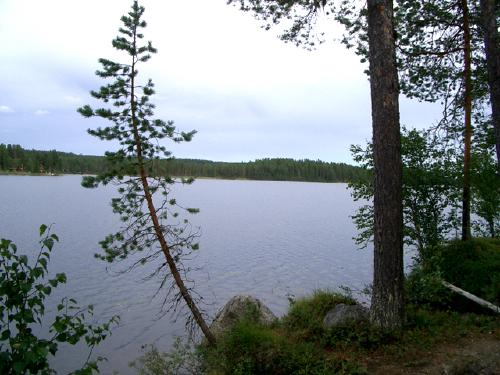
- Kedträsket, 2003
- Interactive map of Kedträsket
- Location: Sweden
- Coordinates: 64°56′51.22″N 19°46′16.86″E
- Max. length: 5 kilometres (3.1 mi)
- Max. width: 0.750 kilometres (0.466 mi)
- Surface area: 2.2 km^{2} (0.85 sq mi)
- Max. depth: 15 m (49 ft)
- Shore length^{1}: 20.9 km (13.0 mi)
- Surface elevation: 221.4 m (726 ft)
- ^{1} Shore length is not a well-defined measure.

Kedträsket is a lake in Norsjö Municipality, province of Västerbotten, Sweden, and is part of the Skellefteälven main catchment area. The lake covers an area of 2.2 square kilometers and has an elevation of 221.4 meters above sea level. Its drainage is facilitated by the watercourse Bjurbäcken.

Kedträsket is divided along its length by the long eskers known here as Burvallsnäsan and Stornäsan, which then becomes Ljussträskkammen and Norakammen, continuing towards Ånäset. The lake is just over five kilometers long and 750 meters wide at Storsundet, where the two parts of the lake meet. Even at Båthalsen, where Stornäsan is barely 20 meters wide and very low, it has long been possible to pull boats across. The lake's only island is called Bäckerholmen.

Not all parts of the lake have official names, but among those that do, in addition to Storsundet, notable ones include Abborrviken, Lomviken, Bladsundet, Inre Storvommen, Yttre Storvommen, Nörd-Skråmhålet, Sör-Skråmhålet, Lillsundet, and Eriksvensaviken. Today, the lake belongs to Bjurträsk FVO and offers free fishing. Perch, northern pike, common roach, lavaret and burbot are some of the fish species that can be found in the lake.

== Etymology ==
The lake has had various names over the years. In 1554, it was called Keide tresk; in 1570, Käder tresk; in 1617, Kiedhertresk; in 1856, Kjidträsket; and in 1884, Kjäd-Träsket. The lake is almost chain-shaped, which is thought to have influenced its name. 'Ked' is an older, poetic term for 'chain', according to SAOL. However, more recent evidence suggests that it is a Sámi name, Geäddiejávrrie, where the prefix means 'bovall'. This would imply that all three lakes around Bjurträsk (Kedträsket, Fäbodträsket, and Bjurträsket) have been referred to as Fäbodträsket, as both Bjurträsket and Fäbodträsket have undergone name changes throughout history.

== History ==
The shores of Kedträsset are rich in ancient monuments from the Stone Age (shard stones) and of a younger, Sámi type (hearths). During the Middle Ages, the lake was one of the lakes in which farmers from the coastal area fished in the mountain swamp. Among others, Nils Albrektsson, a farmer in Myckle (Skellefteå), regularly fished in Kedträsket in 1553, as well as in Bjurträsket, Fäbodträsket, Malån, and Svanselet in Skellefteälven.

== Intake and outlet ==
The lake has its main inlet (apart from bogs that are drained, naturally and by ditches, as well as smaller ponds such as Västre-Daltjärnen, Östre-Daltjärnen, Båthustjärnen and Bretjärnen and, via Ljusträskgraven, also Ljusträsket) in Raningsbäcken and an outlet nearby via Bjurbäcken and Malån to the Skellefteälven river, just downstream of Vargfors power station. In 1854 a canal was also built between the northern part of the lake and Lomtjärn, important for irrigation and the emerging manufacturing. Even that water eventually ends up in Malån.

== Transport and infrastructure ==
A bit north of the lake is County Road 370 and just east of the lake are Boliden's closed mines Uddengruvan and Kedträskgruvan. Kedträsket is located in the Skellefte field and the area is almost constantly flooded. Before the road to Uddengruvan, it is possible to reach the eastern end of the lake, where Sveaskog has a cabin for rent at the bathing area. The cabin is located on a sandy heath, which has also made the place popular for caravan parking, and although it is not an official campsite, it is open to the public, including a fireplace and an outhouse. There is also a swimming area at the western end of the lake, with access from Bjurträsk. South of the lake is the village of Böle, and west of the lake (up by county road 370) is the village that is very rarely called Kedträsk (more often S. Svanheden) but nevertheless gave its name to both the mine and the Kedträsk Bridge (Road 847) over the Skellefteälven river, and also immortalized by the author Torgny Lindgren in the novel Norrlands Akvavit:

"Thanks to Olof Helmersson and the helbrägdar movement, he had been able to carry out his life's work: manage the farm, which was now closed, build the prayer house, which was now demolished, complete the now abolished road to Kedträsk, start the grocery store, which no longer existed, provide for the children, who had now abandoned him, be an alderman in the village, which was now depopulated and deserted, and found the local branch of the People's Party, which was now dissolved. It was with pride and gratitude that in his eighty-sixth year he looked back on his life's work."

Kedträsk was also the name of the short-lived mining community which, from at least the 1960s and well into the 1980s, was located less than a kilometer east of Svanheden along Skelleftevägen, and which housed miners for the three nearby mines. There are hardly any traces of this village today.

== Sub-catchment area ==
Kedträsket is part of the sub-basin (721049–168753) that SMHI calls the outlet of Kedträsket. The average altitude is 234 meters above sea level and the area is 17.02 square kilometers. There are no catchment areas upstream; the catchment area is the highest point. The watercourse draining the catchment area has tributary order 4, which means that the water flows through a total of 4 watercourses before reaching the sea after 102 kilometers. The catchment area is mostly forested (71%). The catchment area has 2.8 square kilometers of water surface, giving it a lake percentage of 16.4 percent.
