= Skräbeån =

Coordinates: 56°02′N 14°28′E

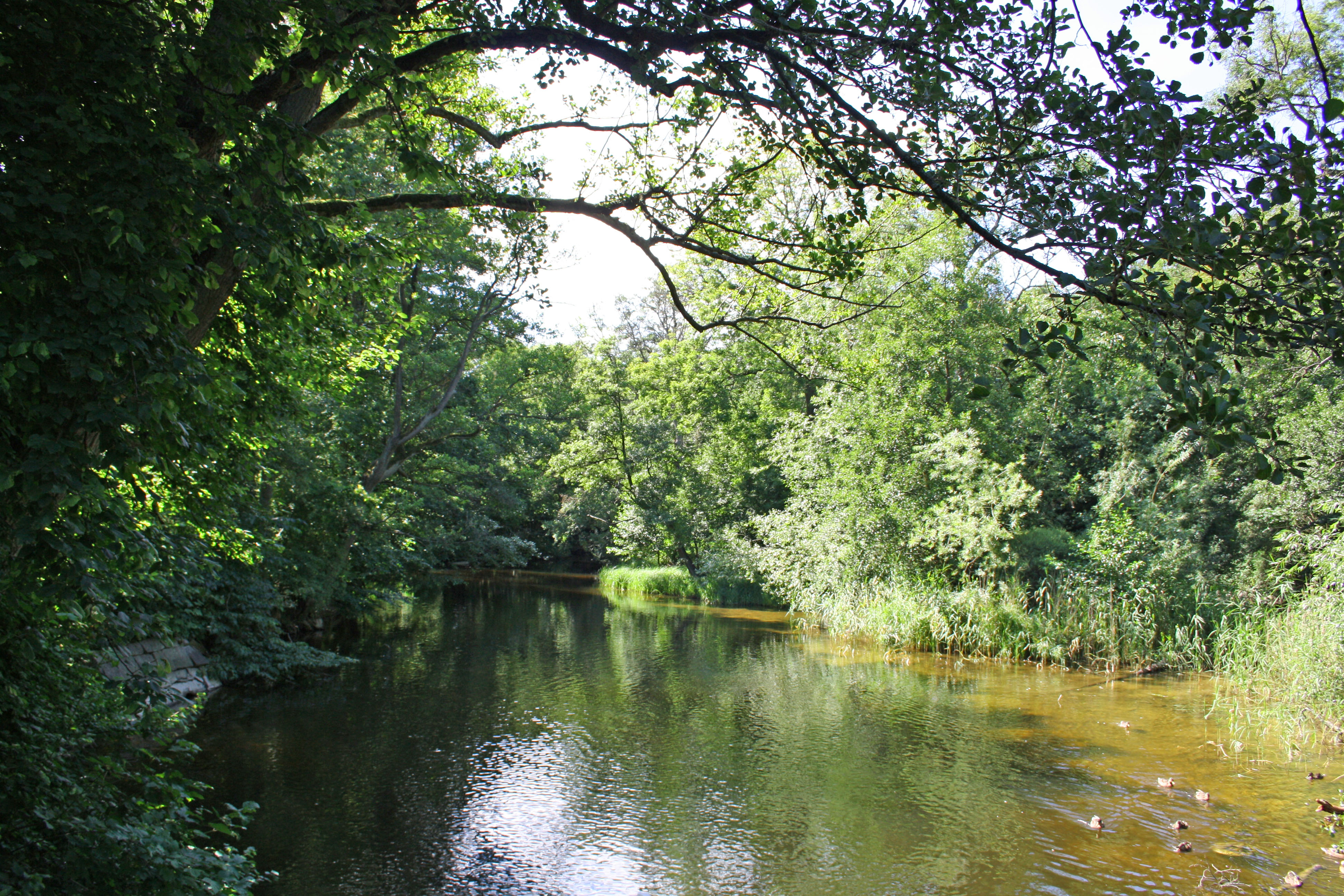

Location
- Country: Sweden

Physical characteristics
- Length: 5 km (3.1 mi)
- Basin size: 1,005.7 km^{2} (388.3 sq mi)
- Discharge
  - average: 9 m^{3}/s (320 cu ft/s)

Skräbeån is a river in the south of Sweden. It is located in the eastern part of Skåne province, in Bromölla Municipality.
