= Storavan =

Lake in Norrbotten County, Sweden

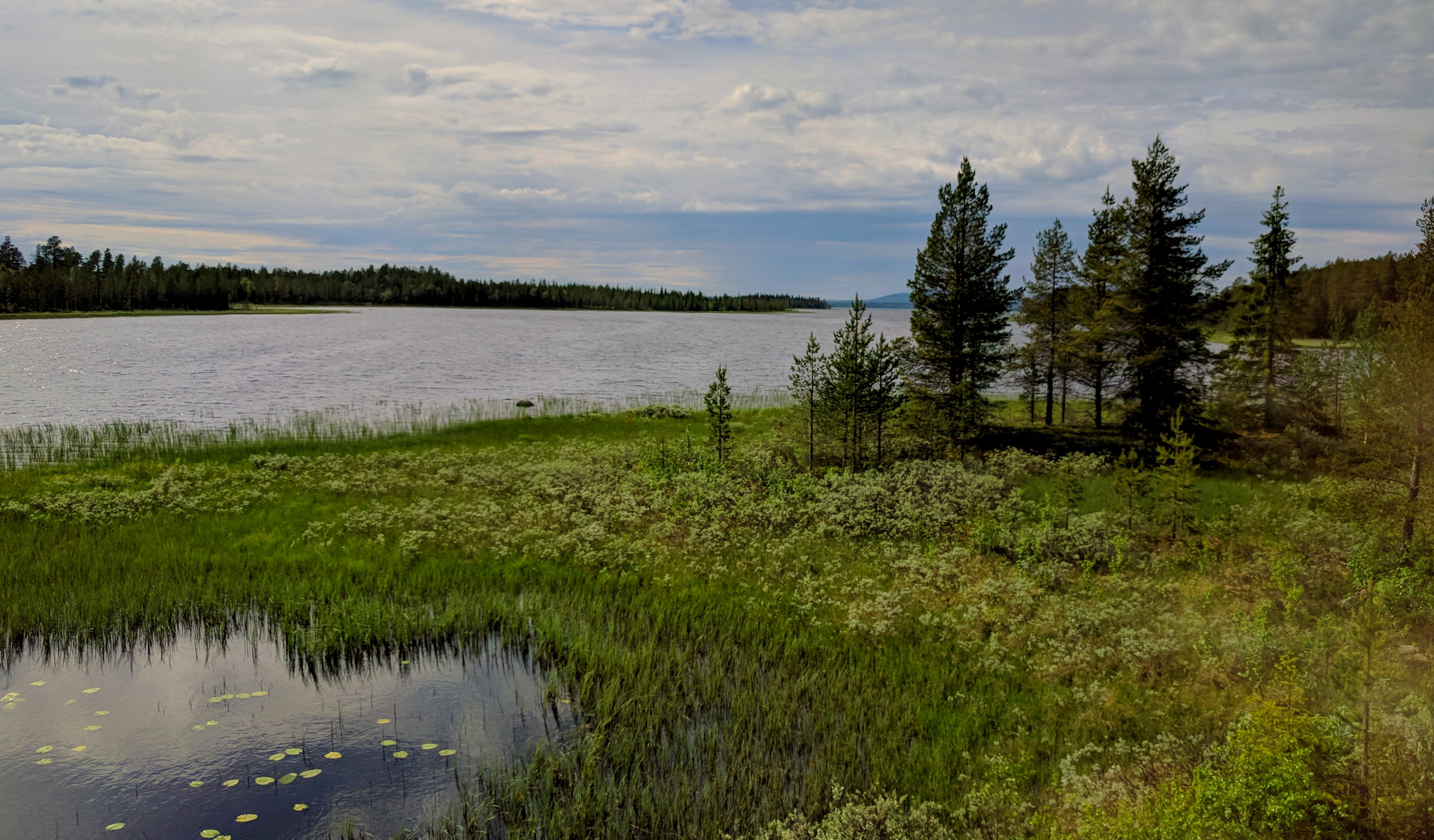

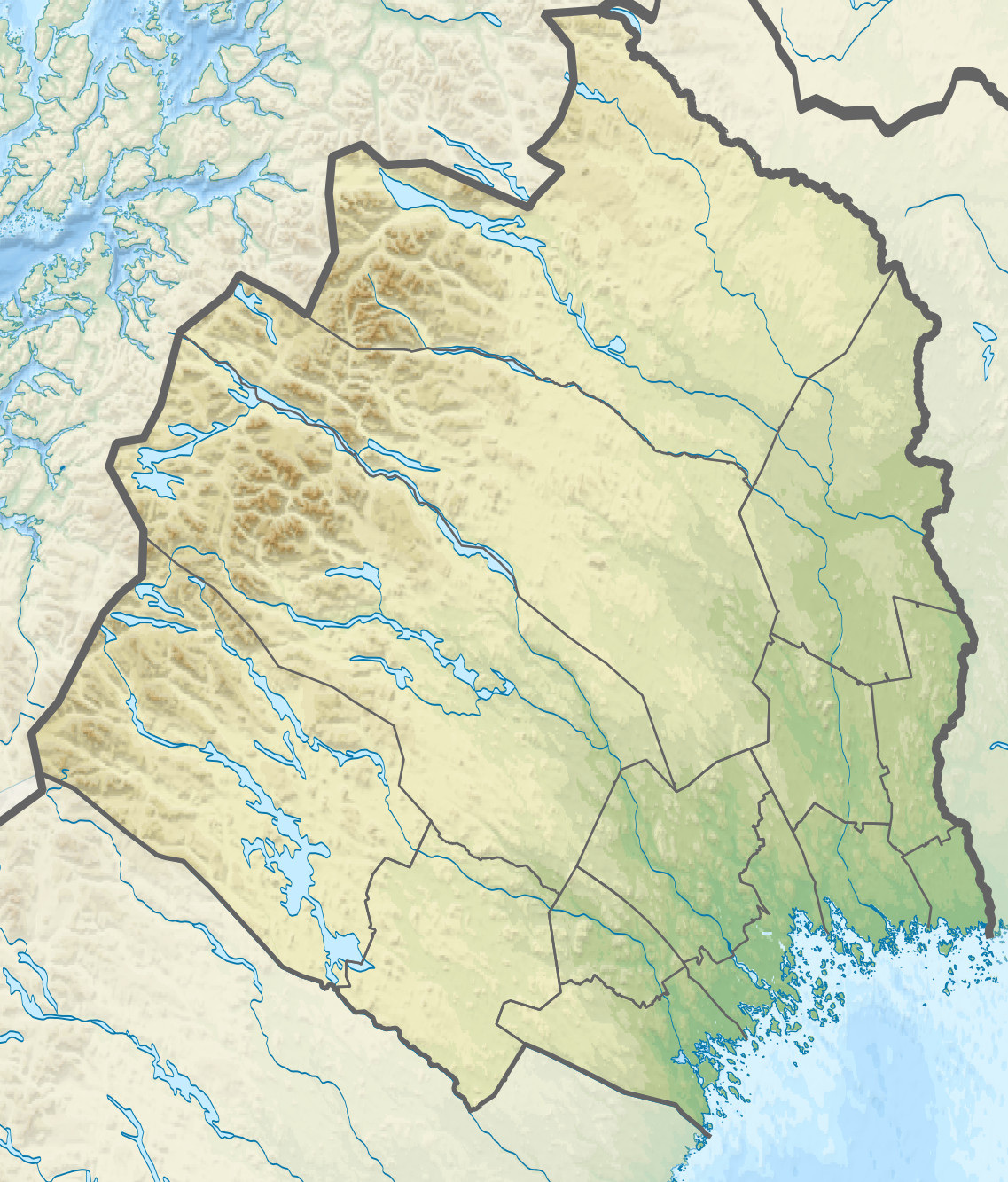
- Location of Storavan in Norrbotten County
- Location: Norrbotten County, Lappland
- Coordinates: 65°58′N 17°50′E
- Basin countries: Sweden
- Surface elevation: 421 m (1,381 ft)

Storavan is a lake in Norrbotten County, Lapland, Sweden, southeast of Lake Uddjaure, 421 metres (1,381 ft) above sea level.

There is a bird reserve near Storavan, which is a breeding site for red-necked grebe.
