= Pite River =

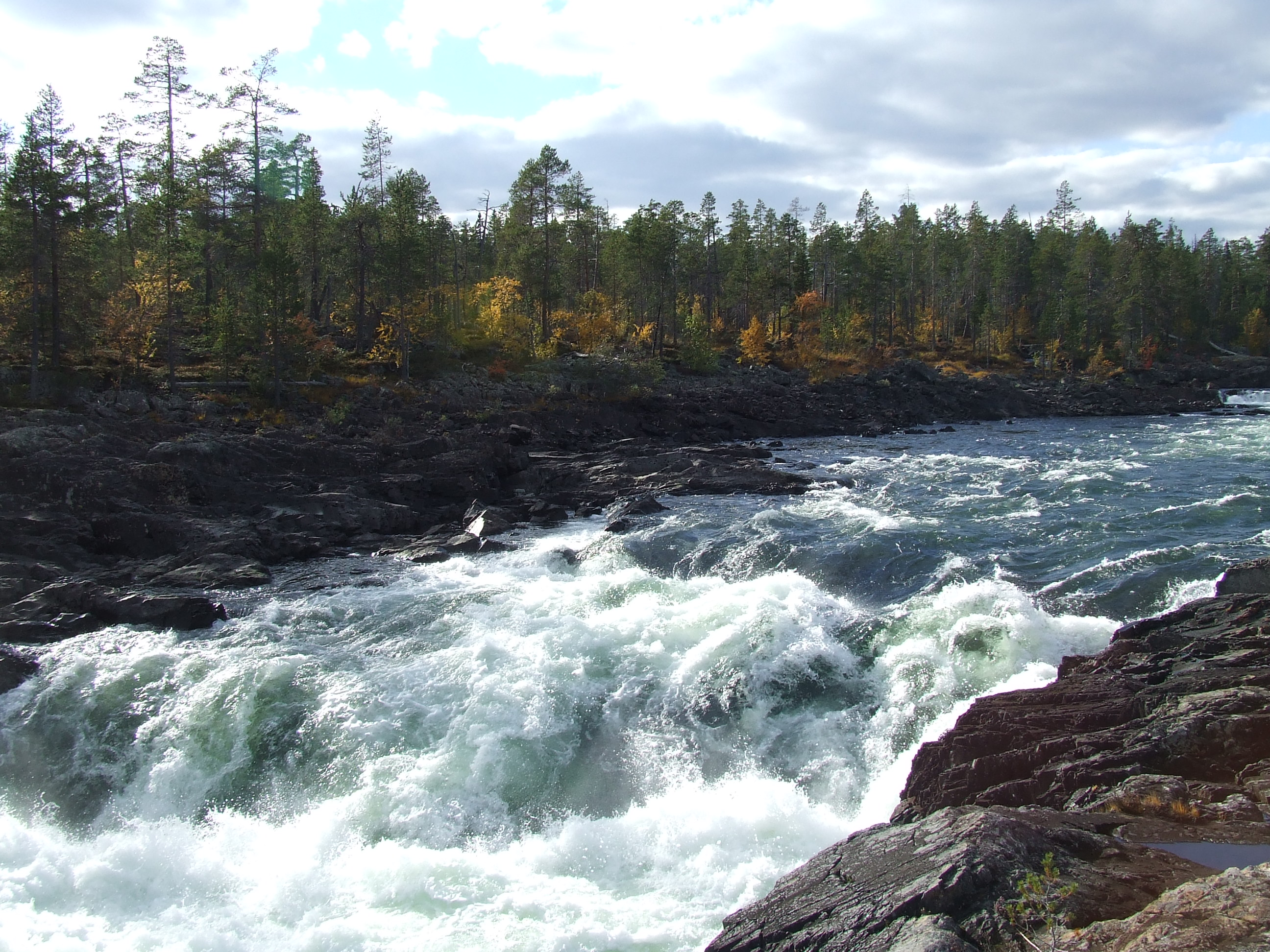
- The Pite River at Trollforsen in September 2010

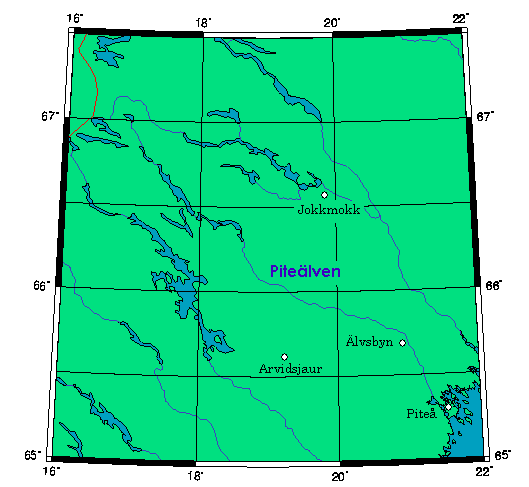
- Outlining Pite River and the seat of municipalities it crosses.
- Native name: Bidumedno (Pite Sami)

Location
- Country: Sweden

Physical characteristics
- Mouth: Bothnian Bay
  - coordinates: 65°21′52″N 21°19′22″E
  - elevation: 0 m (0 ft)
- Length: 400 km (250 mi)
- Basin size: 11,285.3 km^{2} (4,357.3 sq mi)
- Discharge
  - average: 160 m^{3}/s (5,700 cu ft/s)

The Pite River (Bidumedno in Pite Sami. Piteälven or Pite älv in Swedish.) is a river in northern Sweden, flowing through the Norrbotten County. It is one of the four major rivers in Norrland that have been left mostly untouched by water power plants, the river has a single dam at Sikfors approximately 15 km upstream from the sea.

It starts in the large lakes in western Sweden, such as Tjeggelvas, Vuolvojaure and Labbas, in Jokkmokk Municipality, and flows to the east coast, discharging in the Gulf of Bothnia, in the Piteå Municipality.

It has a length of 400 kilometers, covering an area of 11,200 km².

Its largest waterfall is Storforsen, which has also become the most popular place to visit in Norrbotten. It is located in Älvsbyn Municipality.

== See also ==
Some of the other large Norrland rivers:

- Kalix River
- Torne River
- Lule River
- Ume River
- Skellefte River
- Angerman River

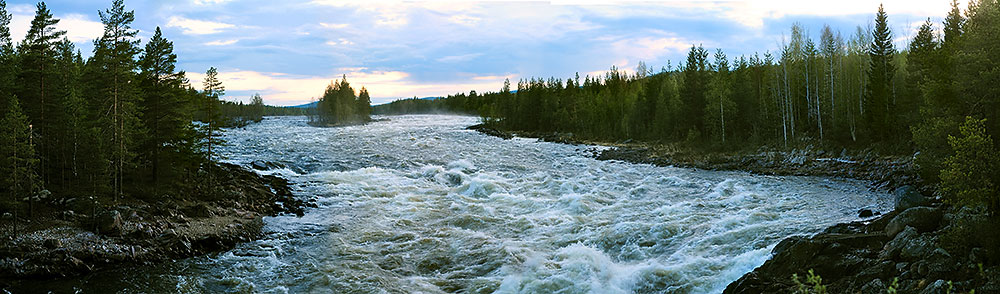
Benbryteforsen in Pite river, May 2009.
