= Vidsel =

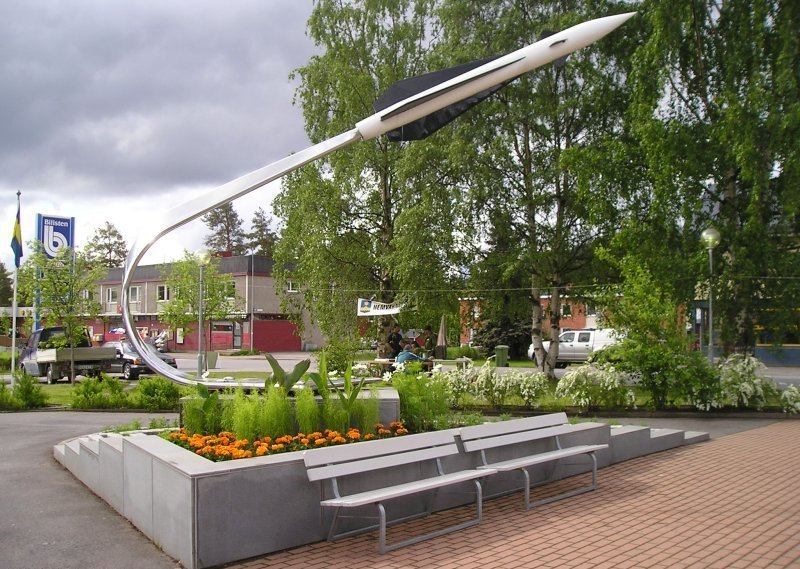

- Location within Norrbotten Location within Sweden
- Coordinates: 65°50′N 20°31′E
- Country: Sweden
- Province: Norrbotten
- County: Norrbotten County
- Municipality: Älvsbyn Municipality

Area
  - Total: 0.74 km^{2} (0.29 sq mi)

Population (31 December 2010)
  - Total: 533
  - Density: 719/km^{2} (1,860/sq mi)
- Time zone: UTC+1 (CET)
  - Summer (DST): UTC+2 (CEST)

Vidsel (Swedish pronunciation: [ˈvîːdseːl]) is a locality situated in Älvsbyn Municipality, Norrbotten County, Sweden with 533 inhabitants in 2010. It is situated about 900 km north of Stockholm, Sweden, near the Arctic Circle.

== History ==
Perhaps its earliest history is as a seasonal settlement, but permanent inhabitants have lived here since the 19th century.

The town was mainly founded in the 1950s, because of "Robotförsöksplats Norr" (RFN) (Missile Test Area North)/Vidsel Test Range. The range forms part of the Swedish Defence Materiel Administration (FMV) Testing Directorate, which is responsible for the verification of systems procured for the Swedish Armed Forces.

RFN is the largest overland test range in Western Europe, consisting of 1,650 km^{2} of uninhabited forest and marshland, which can be extended by 1,500 km^{2} if required. The installation includes a military base with a 2,300 m runway. Because of its usage as a Swedish and European missile test site, this remote area is often listed in international weather forecasts and maps.

The site has been a test area for most Swedish flight developments, including Draken, Viggen and Gripen.
