= Uddjaure =

Lake in Arjeplog Municipality, Norrbotten County, Sweden

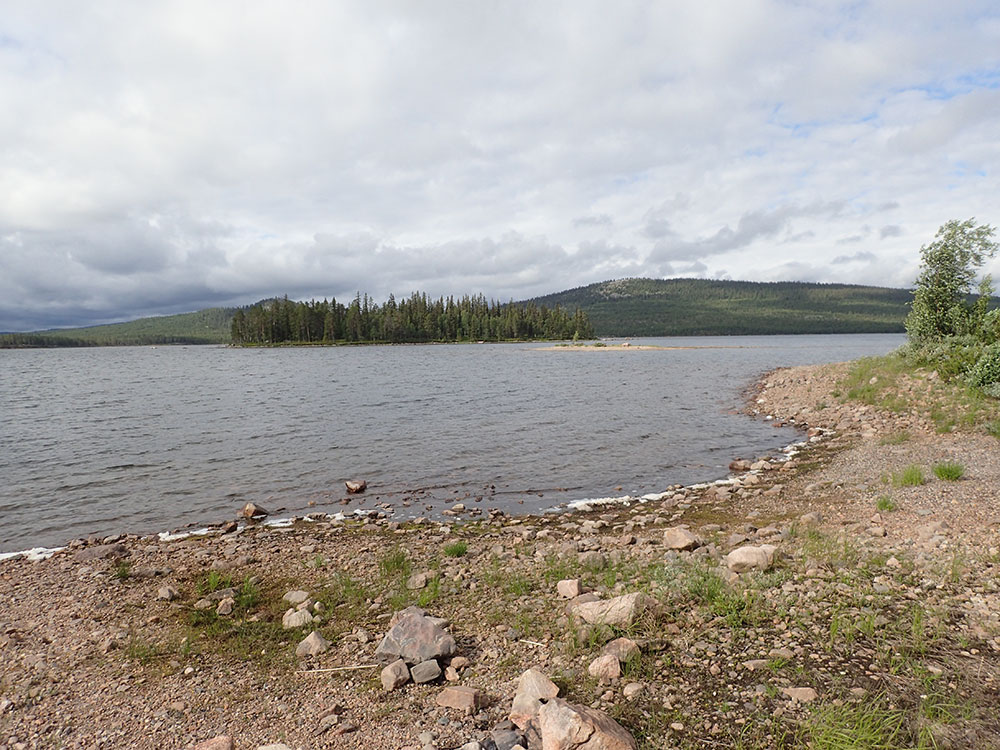

- Location of Uddjaure in Sweden
- Location: Norrbotten County, Lappland
- Coordinates: 65°58′N 17°50′E
- Basin countries: Sweden
- Surface area: 210 km^{2} (81 sq mi)

Uddjaure is a lake in Norrbotten County, Lappland, Sweden, adjacent to Lake Hornavan.
