= Coregonus maxillaris =

Conservation status
- Least Concern (IUCN 3.1)

Scientific classification
- Kingdom: Animalia
- Phylum: Chordata
- Class: Actinopterygii
- Division: Teleostei
- Order: Salmoniformes
- Family: Salmonidae
- Genus: Coregonus
- Species: C. maxillaris

Binomial name
- Coregonus maxillaris Günther, 1866

Species of fish

Coregonus maxillaris is a species of fish belonging to the family Salmonidae.

The species inhabits freshwater environments.
