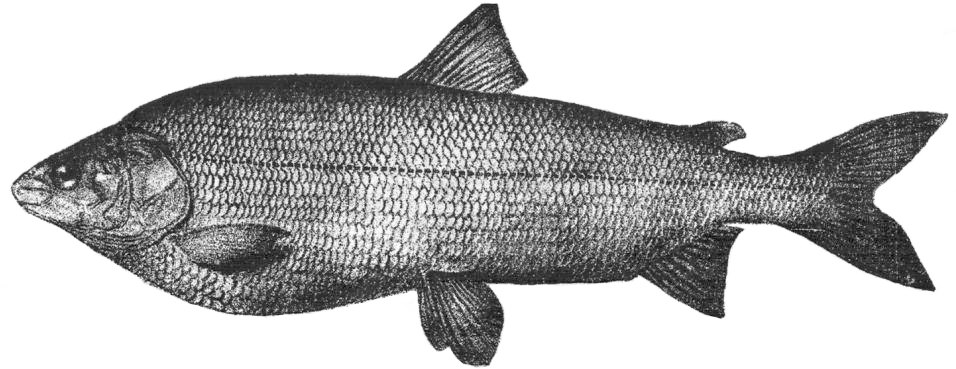

Conservation status
- Data Deficient (IUCN 3.1)

Scientific classification
- Domain: Eukaryota
- Kingdom: Animalia
- Phylum: Chordata
- Class: Actinopterygii
- Order: Salmoniformes
- Family: Salmonidae
- Genus: Coregonus
- Species: C. widegreni

Binomial name
- Coregonus widegreni Malmgren, 1863

Synonyms
- Coregonus lavaretus widegreni Malmgren, 1863

= Coregonus widegreni =

Species of fish

Coregonus widegreni, also called the Valaam whitefish, is a putative species of freshwater whitefish, a part of the common whitefish complex (Coregonus lavaretus sensu lato) from Northern Europe. It is a demersal form of freshwater whitefish that feeds on benthic invertebrates. It spawns in late autumn, and can reach a length of 55 cm maximum. It is characterized by a low gill raker density.

In the strict sense the name C. widegreni refers to a population of whitefish that inhabits relatively deep waters (50–150 m) of Lake Ladoga in Northwest Russia. More often the range is thought to comprise coastal areas of the Baltic Sea (except southern section of the Swedish coast) and several larger lakes in Sweden (e.g. Vänern, Vättern) and Northwest Russia (Onega). It is one of several types of whitefish co-distributed in Northern Europe and exhibiting different breeding and feeding habits. In the Northern Baltic, C. [lavaretus] widegreni has referred to bottom-feeding whitefish that spawn in the sea ("lesser sparsely-rakered whitefish", in contrast to migratory anadromous whitefish referred to as C. lavaretus lavaretus.

In contemporary Nordic usage, C. widegreni is not recognised as a distinct species, but at most as an ecotype or morphotype of Coregonus lavaretus or of Coregonus maraena.
