= List of shipwrecks in October 1878 =

The list of shipwrecks in October 1878 includes ships sunk, foundered, grounded, or otherwise lost during October 1878.

== 1 October ==
List of shipwrecks: 1 October 1878
| Ship | State | Description |
|---|---|---|
| Batrak | Russia | The steamship was driven ashore and wrecked on Sakhalin. Her crew were rescued. She was a total loss. |
| Clotilde | United Kingdom | The ship was driven ashore and wrecked at Point Idio, Argentina. |
| Elimo | United Kingdom | The ship was wrecked in the Mosquito Inlet. Her crew were rescued. She was on a voyage from "Santa Anna" to Queenstown, County Cork. |
| Esther Smeed | United Kingdom | The barque was driven ashore and wrecked at Sando, Gotland, Sweden. Her crew were rescued. She was on a voyage from Gävle, Sweden to London. |
| Miazeppa | United Kingdom | The ship was driven ashore in the River Mersey. She was on a voyage from Liverpool, Lancashire to Dublin. |
| Pioneer | United Kingdom | The ship was driven ashore at Point Idio. She was on a voyage from Cardiff, Glamorgan to Fray Bentos, Uruguay. |
| St. Charles | France | The smack was driven ashore at the Hurst Castle, Hampshire, United Kingdom. She was on a voyage from Granville, Manche to Southampton, Hampshire. She was refloated the next day and taken in tow. |
| Victoria | United Kingdom | The ship was driven ashore on Tybee Island, Georgia, United States. She was on a voyage from the Bull River to Swansea, Glamorgan. She was refloated. |
| William McGilvery | United Kingdom | The ship ran aground at Liverpool. She was on a voyage from Saint John, New Brunswick, Canada to Liverpool. She was refloated with assistance from the tugs Great Britain and Great Western. |

== 2 October ==
List of shipwrecks: 2 October 1878
| Ship | State | Description |
|---|---|---|
| Amelia | United Kingdom | The ship ran aground at Penarth, Glamorgan. She was refloated and put back to Cardiff, Glamorgan. |
| Franklin | United States | The ship was wrecked at Bordeaux, Gironde, France. |
| Mazeppa | United Kingdom | The ship was driven ashore in the River Mersey. She was on a voyage from Liverpool, Lancashire to Dublin. |
| Paix et Union | France | The brig was driven ashore between Sines and St. Ubes, Portugal. Her crew were rescued. She was on a voyage from Huelva, Spain to Liverpool. |
| Plimsoll | Norway | The barque was wrecked at Bordeaux. |
| Rivadeo | Spain | The ship departed from Baltimore, Maryland, United States for Les Sables d'Olonne, Vendée, France. No further trace, reported missing. |
| Robert Porter | United States | The ship was wrecked at Bordeaux. |
| Wings of the Morning | United Kingdom | The barque ran aground on the Blacktail Sand, in the Thames Estuary. She was on a voyage from Kronstadt, Russia to London. She was refloated with the assistance of a tug and resumed her voyage. |
| W. McGilvery | United Kingdom | The ship ran aground at Liverpool. She was refloated with assistance from the tugs Great Britain and Great Western (both United Kingdom). |

== 3 October ==
List of shipwrecks: 3 October 1878
| Ship | State | Description |
|---|---|---|
| Alne Holme | United Kingdom | The steamship was driven ashore in the Kyle Rhea. She was refloated on 7 October. |
| British Seaman | United Kingdom | The brigantine collided with the barque Anthippe (Greece) and sank in the English Channel, 15 nautical miles (28 km) south east by east of Portland Bill, Dorset. Her crew were rescued by Anthippe. British Seaman was on a voyage from Hull, Yorkshire to Gibraltar. |
| Harbour Grace | United Kingdom | The ship departed from Lagos, Lagos Colony for a British port. No further trace, reported missing. |
| Hohenzollern | Germany | The ship was driven ashore at Ensenada, Argentina. She was on avoyage from Marseille, Bouches-du-Rhône, France to Buenos Aires, Argentina. |
| Hoopoe | United Kingdom | The ship was sighted off Prawle Point, Devon whilst on a voyage from Hamburg, Germany to Porto, Portugal. No further trace, reported missing. |
| Osprey | United Kingdom | The ship ran aground on the Burbo Bank, in Liverpool Bay. She was on a voyage from Liverpool, Lancashire to Dublin. She was refloated with assistance from a tug and resumed her voyage. |
| Providential | United Kingdom | The ship was driven ashore on "Vulfao". She was on a voyage from Kronstadt, Russia to London. She was refloated on 25 October with the assistance of a steamship and taken in to Reval, Russia. |
| Star of Peace | United Kingdom | The ship was driven ashore and wrecked at Ensenada. She was on a voyage from Goole, Yorkshire to Buenos Aires. |

== 4 October ==
List of shipwrecks: 4 October 1878
| Ship | State | Description |
|---|---|---|
| Bannockburn | United Kingdom | The ship was driven ashore at "Rasseilun". She was on a voyage from Cardiff, Glamorgan to Aden, Aden Colony. She was refloated and taken in to Aden. |
| Ceylon | United Kingdom | The steamship was driven ashore in the Sound of Kilrea. |
| Gezina | Germany | The ship was driven ashore at Narva Russia. Her crew were rescued. She was on a voyage from Liverpool, Lancashire. United Kingdom to Narva. She was refloated. |
| Granton, and Perulia | United Kingdom | The steamships collided in the River Thames and were both severely damaged. Perulia was on her maiden voyage. |
| Storfursten | (Russian Empire) Grand Duchy of Finland | The ship ran aground in the Holmöarna, Sweden. She was on a voyage from Oulu to Helsingør, Denmark. She was refloated and put in to "Marvattan", Sweden. |
| Vigilant | Canada | The ship departed from Baltimore, Maryland, United States for Porto, Portugal. No further trace, reported missing. |
| Wings of the Morning | United Kingdom | The barque ran aground in the River Thames at Northfleet, Kent. She capsized as the tide went out. Righted with assistance from the tug Triumph (United Kingdom) and taken in to London in a severely hogged condition. |

== 5 October ==
List of shipwrecks: 5 October 1878
| Ship | State | Description |
|---|---|---|
| Anna Louisa | United Kingdom | The schooner ran aground on the Haisborough Sands, in the North Sea off the coast of Norfolk. She was on a voyage from Rye, Sussex to Seaham, County Durham. She was refloated with the assistance of a smack and a tug and towed in to Great Yarmouth, Norfolk. |
| Cydonia | United Kingdom | The steamship ran aground on a reef. She was on a voyage from "Roweyrah" to Jeddah, Hejaz Vilayet. She was refloated the next day and taken in to Jeddah. |
| Earl of Devon | United Kingdom | The schooner was scuttled after breaking free of her moorings and drifting through the harbour at Penzance, Cornwall. |
| Volunteer | United Kingdom | The schooner capsized in a squall outside of the harbour at Holyhead, Anglesey. |

== 6 October ==
List of shipwrecks: 6 October 1878
| Ship | State | Description |
|---|---|---|
| Alexandre | France | The lugger struck the east side of Penberth Cove, Cornwall, United Kingdom and broke up with the loss of all hands. The ship's boat was washed ashore at Perranuthnoe, in Mount's Bay. |
| Iris | Norway | The ship was wrecked near "Rusobank. |
| Livonian, and Zoe | United Kingdom | The steamships collided in the Sea of Marmara. Livonian sank. All on board were rescued. She was on a voyage from Liverpool, Lancashire to Constantinople, Ottoman Empire. Zoe was on a voyage from Odesa, Russia to a British port. She was severely damaged and put in to Constantinople for repairs which were estimated to need five weeks to complete. |
| Maria | United Kingdom | The schooner was driven ashore at Boulmer, Northumberland. She was on a voyage from Lyme Regis, Dorset to Leith, Lothian. She was refloated with the assistance of a tug and taken in to Amble, Northumberland. |

== 7 October ==
List of shipwrecks: 7 October 1878
| Ship | State | Description |
|---|---|---|
| Caspar | United Kingdom | The brig foundered 86 nautical miles (159 km) south of the Isles of Scilly, according to a message in a bottle that washed up at Falmouth, Cornwall. |
| Castelia | United Kingdom | The schooner struck an anchor and was beached at Great Yarmouth, Norfolk. she was on a voyage from the River Tyne to Saint-Malo, Ille-et-Vilaine, France. She was refloated and taken in to Great Yarmouth. |
| Charlotte | United Kingdom | The schooner was driven on to the Cow Rocks, off the coast of Pembrokeshire and sank. Her four crew were rescued by the Goodwick Lifeboat. She was on a voyage from Port Madoc, Caernarfonshire to Stockton-on-Tees, County Durham. |
| Diana | United Kingdom | The steamship foundered 20 nautical miles (37 km) south west of Portland Bill, Dorset. Her crew were rescued by the schooner Kvik (Norway). Diana was on a voyage from Havre de Grâce, Seine-Inférieure, France to Swansea, Glamorgan or vice versa. |
| Emily | United Kingdom | The brig was abandoned in the Atlantic Ocean. Her crew were rescued by Amelia Garguilo (flag unknown). Emily was on a voyage from Charleston, South Carolina, United States to Newcastle upon Tyne, Northumberland. |
| Escort | United Kingdom | The brigantine was abandoned off Bermuda in a hurricane. Her crew were rescued by the barque Argo (Russia). Escort was on a voyage from Curaçao, Curaçao and Dependencies to Plymouth, Devon. |
| Fervent | United Kingdom | The steamship ran aground at Blyth, Northumberland. She was on a voyage from London to Sunderland, County Durham. |
| Integrity | United Kingdom | The schooner was abandoned off St. Agnes, Isles of Scilly. A crew member was reported missing. She was on a voyage from Lisbon, Portugal to Wicklow. She came ashore at St. Agnes. |
| Laurel | United Kingdom | The steamship was driven ashore at Lindisfarne, Northumberland. She was refloated and resumed her voyage. |
| Maria Read | United Kingdom | The schooner ran aground in Wick Bay. She was refloated with assistance. |
| Mathilda | Sweden | The barque was driven ashore on Lolland, Denmark. She was on a voyage from Kiel, Germany to Kalmar. She was refloated and taken in to Korsør, Denmark in a leaky condition. |
| Reaper | United Kingdom | The brigantine foundered in the Irish Sea 30 nautical miles (56 km) west south west of The Skerries, Anglesey with the loss of all eight people on board. She was being towed from Garston, Lancashire to Dublin. |
| Trafalgar | United Kingdom | The schooner sank at Holyhead, Anglesey with the loss of three of her six cew. |

== 8 October ==
List of shipwrecks: 8 October 1878
| Ship | State | Description |
|---|---|---|
| Aagat | Norway | The barque collided with another barque in the English Channel and was severely damaged. The other vessel failed to stop and render assistance. She was on a voyage from Hudiksvall, Sweden to Santander, Spain. She was towed in to Portland, Dorset, United Kingdom by the steamship Peer of the Realm (United Kingdom) in a waterlogged condition. |
| Amorette | United Kingdom | The brig arrived at Port Nolloth, Cape Colony from London on fire. |
| Bessie | United Kingdom | The smack became hung up between Sarah Ann and Susie May (both United Kingdom) at Padstow, Cornwall and was severely damaged. |
| Brothers | United Kingdom | The ship ran aground on the Gunfleet Sand, in the North Sea off the coast of Essex. She was on a voyage from the River Thames to the River Tyne. |
| Bucephalus | United Kingdom | The coal hulk caught fire at Gibraltar and was scuttled. |
| Curlew | United Kingdom | The steamship was driven ashore in the Bay of Islands. She was refloated. |
| Dalton | United Kingdom | The steamship ran aground on the Englishman's Shoal, in the Bosphorus. She was on a voyage from Taganrog, Russia to Malta. |
| Doctor | United Kingdom | The brig ran aground in the Guadalquivír. |
| Isolina | United Kingdom | The ship ran aground in the Carimata Strait. She was on a voyage from Singapore, Straits Settlements to Liverpool, Lancashire. She was refloated and resumed her voyage. |
| Laurel | United Kingdom | The barque ran aground at "Casmisha", Russia. |
| R. B. Gove | United States | The ship was damaged by fire at Montrose, Forfarshire, United Kingdom. |
| Ste. Marie | France | The fishing boat collided with the steamship Ceres (United Kingdom) and sank in the North Sea 109 nautical miles (202 km) east of Whitby, Yorkshire, United Kingdom with the loss of a crew member. Seventeen or nineteen survivors were rescued by Ceres. |
| Vanguard | United Kingdom | The ship foundered off Holyhead, Anglesey with the loss of three of her crew. |
| Vila Nova | Spain | The brigantine ran aground in the Guadalquivír. |
| Volunteer | United Kingdom | The schooner capsized at Holyhead with the loss of three of her four crew. |
| Whitburn | United Kingdom | The steamship ran aground at Kertch. She was refloated and resumed her voyage. |

== 9 October ==
List of shipwrecks: 9 October 1878
| Ship | State | Description |
|---|---|---|
| Clara | Sweden | The steamship was driven ashore on Öland. She was refloated with assistance from Poseidon (Sweden) and taken in to Oskarshamn. |
| Eclipse | United Kingdom | The ship was driven ashore at "Kernaghan Point", Islandmagee, County Antrim. She was on a voyage from Ayr to Belfast, County Antrim. She subsequently broke up. |
| Fyen | Netherlands | The steamship ran aground at Brouwershaven, Zeeland. She was on a voyage from Rotterdam, South Holland to Antwerp, Belgium. She was refloated the next day with the assistance of tugs and resumed her voyage. |
| H. P. Stephenson | United Kingdom | The steamship was damaged by fire at Havre de Grâce, Seine-Inférieure, France. She was on a voyage from Taganrog, Russia to Havre de Grâce. |
| J. B. Duffus | United Kingdom | The barque was run down at Cuxhaven, Germany by the steamship Alert (Germany). J. B. Duffus was on a voyage from Philadelphia, Pennsylvania, United States to Hamburg, Germany. She was severely damaged, became waterlogged and ran aground. She was refloated on 18 October with the assistance of two tugs. |
| Margaretha | Germany | The barque was driven ashore at "Gaffeskar", Sweden. She was on a voyage from "Grimsmouth" to Rostock. |
| Martha | Norway | The full-rigged ship was driven ashore and wrecked on "Hono". Her crew were rescued. She was on a voyage from Baltimore, Maryland United States to Helsingør, Denmark. She was refloated on 10 October and towed in to Gothenburg, Sweden. |
| Mary | United Kingdom | The Mersey Flat foundered off Garston, Lancashire. Her crew were rescued. |

== 10 October ==
List of shipwrecks: 10 October 1878
| Ship | State | Description |
|---|---|---|
| Ann, and Essay | United Kingdom | The schooner Ann collided with the brigantine Essay off Great Yarmouth, Norfolk. Both vessels were severely damaged. Ann was on a voyage from Seaham, County Durham to Colchester, Essex. |
| Alfred et Marguerite | France | The ship departed from Martinique for Havre de Grâce, Seine-Inférieure. No further trace, reported overdue. |
| Blonde | United Kingdom | The fishing smack was wrecked on the Haisborough Sands, in the North Sea off the coast of Norfolk. Her crew took to the boats; they were rescued by the smack Rowena (United Kingdom). |
| Camperdown | United Kingdom | The whaler was wrecked in Icelandic waters. Her crew were rescued. |
| Carn Tual | United Kingdom | The barque was abandoned in the Solway Firth. Her crew were rescued by the Maryport Lifeboat and the tugs Maryport and Whitehaven (both United Kingdom). Carn Tual was on a voyage from Maryport, Cumberland to an American port. She was refloated on 10 October and towed in to Whitehaven, Cumberland. |
| Copia | United Kingdom | The steamship was sighted off Father Point, Quebec, Canada whilst on a voyage from Barrow-in-Furness, Lancashire to Montreal, Quebec. No further trace, presumed foundered with the loss of all hands. |
| Curlew | United Kingdom | The steamship was holed by an anchor off Cardiff, Glamorgan. She was on a voyage from Cardiff to the Charente. She put back to Cardiff in a sinking condition. |
| Eblana | United Kingdom | The full-rigged ship capsized in the Atlantic Ocean (48°30′N 10°19′W) and was abandoned by her 28 crew, who were rescued by the barque Decapolis (United Kingdom). Eblana was on a voyage from Liverpool, Lancashire to Madras, India. She was discovered on 15 October by the steamship Cyclop (Germany), which put some of her crew aboard. She arrived at Liverpool on 21 October. |
| Genrio Maru | Japan | The ship was abandoned at sea with the loss of seventeen lives. |
| George Brown | United Kingdom | The ship was beached in Angle Bay. She was on a voyage from Cardiff, Glamorgan to Cork. She heeled over and was severely damaged. |
| Grossherzog Friedrich Franz | Germany | The brig was abandoned in the North Sea. Her crew were rescued by Condor ( (Russian Empire) Grand Duchy of Finland). Grossherzog Friedrich Franz was on a voyage from South Shields, County Durham to Rostock. |
| Integrity | United Kingdom | The schooner lost her foremast and longboat in heavy seas off the Bishop Rock, Isles of Scilly. Carrying lime phosphates from Lisbon to Wicklow she found it impossible to manoeuvre in Smith Sound and drifted around Annet before being beached in Perconger, St Agnes. One of the four crew jumped overboard and drowned. Two days later she was refloated and taken to St Mary's. |
| Lewes Lass | United Kingdom | The ship ran aground at Hartlepool, County Durham. She was on a voyage from Dover, Kent to Hartlepool. |
| Margaret Boyd, or Mary Boyd | United Kingdom | The barquentine was abandoned in the Atlantic Ocean. Her crew were rescued by the steamship Ohio (United Kingdom), which placed a prize crew on board. The barquentine was on a voyage from Miramichi, New Brunswick, Canada to Ayr. |
| Rover | United Kingdom | The steamship was abandoned in the English Channel. Her crew were rescued by the steamship Ullswater (United Kingdom). Rover was on a voyage from Middlesbrough, Yorkshire to Vinaròs, Spain. She was taken in tow by Ullswater, but the towline broke. Subsequently towed in to Sutton Harbour, Devon in a sinking condition by the tug Ben Nevis (United Kingdom). |
| Spero Expecto | United Kingdom | The smack ran aground on the Scroby Sands, Norfolk. She was refloated with assistance and taken in to Great Yarmouth, Norfolk. |
| Vandse | Flag unknown | The ship struck a rock and sank at Santander, Spain. She was on a voyage from Santander to Cardiff, Glamorgan, United Kingdom. |

== 11 October ==
List of shipwrecks: 11 October 1878
| Ship | State | Description |
|---|---|---|
| Alice M. Bears | United States | The schooner ran aground near Grand Haven, Michigan in a gale and high seas. She was scuttled to minimize damage. Her seven crew were rescued by the United States Life Saving Service. Raised and repaired after the storm passed. |
| Marguerite | Sweden | The barque ran aground at Grangemouth, Stirlingshire, United Kingdom. She was on a voyage from Grangemouth to Gothenburg. She was refloated and resumed her voyage. |
| Nuro Rattler | Italy | The ship departed from New York, United States for Cette, Hérault, France. No further trace, presumed foundered with the loss of all hands. |
| St. Etienne | France | The chasse-marée ran aground on the Warden Ledge Rocks, off the Isle of Wight, United Kingdom. She was on a voyage from Dunkirk, Nord to Brest, Finistère. |
| Vendée | France | The steamship struck a rock and sank at Santander, Spain. She was on a voyuage from Santander to Cardiff, Glamorgan, United Kingdom. |
| Two unnamed vessels | France | The lighters were run down and sunk at Bordeaux, Gironde by the steamship Araucania (United Kingdom). |

== 12 October ==
List of shipwrecks: 12 October 1878
| Ship | State | Description |
|---|---|---|
| Britain's Pride | United Kingdom | The brig foundered in the Atlantic Ocean off Faro, Portugal. Her crew survived. She was on a voyage from Huelva, Spain to London. |
| Gaetano di Campo | Italy | The barque was wrecked at Cape Prior, Spain. Her crew were rescued. She was on a voyage from Genoa to Cork, United Kingdom. |
| Marie | Denmark | The schooner was wrecked at Hadersleben. Her crew were rescued. She was on a voyage from Newcastle upon Tyne, Northumberland United Kingdom to Haderslev. |
| Nicolaus | Germany | The schooner was damaged in a typhoon at Hong Kong. |
| Northern Star | United Kingdom | The barque was damaged in a typhoon at Hong Kong. |
| Susan | United States | The whaper, a barque, capsized in the Atlantic Ocean with the loss of 22 of her 25 crew. Survivors were rescued on 15 October by a New York pilot boat. |
| Trio | Netherlands | The barque was damaged in a typhoon at Hong Kong. |
| Varuna | Germany | The barque was damaged in a typhoon at Hong Kong. |
| Vesta | United Kingdom | The steamship ran aground at Cape Hellas, Ottoman Empire. She was on a voyage from Cardiff, Glamorgan to Constantinople, Ottoman Empire. She was refloated the next day and resumed her voyage. |

== 13 October ==
List of shipwrecks: 13 October 1878
| Ship | State | Description |
|---|---|---|
| Clanalpine | United Kingdom | The steamship ran aground and sprang a leak. She was on a voyage from Montrose, Forfarshire to Dublin. She put in to Crail, Fife. |
| Felixstowe | New South Wales | The barque hit rocks north of Otaki and broke up. The crew took to the boats to come ashore, but one boat capsized, drowning four (among then the ship's captain). She was on a voyage from Newcastle to Lyttelton, New Zealand. |
| Graf Moltke | Germany | The ship was abandoned in a sinking condition. Her crew were rescued. She was on a voyage from Stettin to NEw York, United States. |
| Huntsman | United Kingdom | The ship was driven ashore at North Somercotes, Lincolnshire. She was refloated the next day. |
| Josepf Story | United States | The schooner broke her anchor chains and stranded on the beach on Commons Flat in a gale and high seas near Life Saving Station No. 13, 2nd District and wrecked on the outer bar. The United States Life Saving Service rescued the one crewman on board, the rest having gone to town the evening before. |
| M. A. von Gadow | Germany | The ship departed from Helsingør, Denmark for London, United Kingdom. No further trace, reported missing |
| T. & C. Hawes | United States | The schooner dragged anchor and stranded on the beach on Commons Flat in a gale and high seas near Life Saving Station No. 13, 2nd District. Her crew had anchored her the previous evening and went to Chatham, Massachusetts for the evening. The United States Life Saving Service found the crew of the sunk Tunis de Pew (United States) on board and they helped refloat the vessel. |
| Tunis de Pew | United States | The schooner sank on Commons Flat in a gale and high seas near Life Saving Station No. 13, 2nd District, she was lost. Her crew of four transferred by her boat to the stranded T. & C. Hawes (United States) whose crew had abandoned her earlier. |

== 14 October ==
List of shipwrecks: 14 October 1878
| Ship | State | Description |
|---|---|---|
| Hild | Sweden | The schooner ran aground in the channel at Wells-next-the-Sea, Norfolk, United Kingdom. She was on a voyage from Königsberg, Germany to Wells-next-the-Sea. |
| Ocean King | United Kingdom | The steamship ran aground in the Yangtze. She was refloated and resumedn her voyage. |
| Prinds Karl | Sweden | The ship was wrecked on the Horns Reef, in the Baltic Sea. Her crew were rescued; She was on a voyage from Skellefteå to Tönning, Germany. |
| Silfida | Russia | The paddle steamer collided with the torpedo boat Treska (Imperial Russian Navy) in the Gulf of Finland and was damaged. Thinking she was sinking, many passengers took to the lifeboats. Silfida was on a voyage from Saint Petersburg to Kronstadt. Her passengers were subsequently taken aboard again and she resumed her voyage. |
| Summer Fly | United Kingdom | The ship struck a rock off the Newarp Sand, in the North Sea. She was on a voyage from King's Lynn, Norfolk to Pontorson, Manche, France. She put in to Harwich, Essex, where she sank. |

== 15 October ==
List of shipwrecks: 15 October 1878
| Ship | State | Description |
|---|---|---|
| Bell Keith | United Kingdom | The ship was driven ashore at Pernambuco, Brazil. She was on a voyage from Rio de Janeiro to Natal, Brazil. She was refloated and completed her voyage. |
| Chancellor | United Kingdom | The ship ran aground in the Gironde at Lormont, Gironde. She was on a voyage from Pabellón de Pica, Peru to Bordeaux, Gironde. |
| Fastnet | United Kingdom | The steamship ran aground at Horse Island, County Cork. She was on a voyage from Cork to Bantry, County Cork. |
| Fiado | United Kingdom | The steamship ran aground at Nidingen, Sweden. She was on a voyage from Sunderland, County Durham to Danzig, Germany. She was refloated on 22 October. |
| Ignis Fatuus | Germany | The brigantine was wrecked at Porto, Portugal. Her crew were rescued. She was on a voyage from Philadelphia, Pennsylvania, United States to Porto. |
| Joseph | Netherlands | The ship was wrecked on Rottum, Groningen. She was on a voyage from Riga, Russia to Delfzijl, Groningen. |
| Lady Josyan | United Kingdom | The steamship was driven ashore at San Stefano Point, Ottoman Empire. She was on a voyage from Newcastle upon Tyne, Northumberland to Constanţa, United Principalities. |
| Maria Clara | Germany | The ship ran aground at "Reddinge", Sweden. She was on a voyage from Königsberg to London, United Kingdom. She was refloated. |
| Sandefjord | Norway | The steamship was driven ashore and sank near Vardø. |
| Unnamed | United Kingdom | The brig ran aground at "Reddinge". She was refloated. |

== 16 October ==
List of shipwrecks: 16 October 1878
| Ship | State | Description |
|---|---|---|
| Geerdina Affina | Netherlands | The ship foundered off Cape Ortegal, Spain. Her crew were rescued. She was on a voyage from Ancona, Italy to Danzig, Germany. |
| Glen Osmond | South Australia | The ship was driven ashore at Adelaide. She was on a voyage from Adelaide to the Lacepede Islands, Western Australia. |
| Hoppet | Russia | The barque was abandoned in the Atlantic Ocean. Her crew were rescued by the whaler Reindeer (United States). Hoppet was on a voyage from the Bull River to London, United Kingdom. |
| Ida | Denmark | The ship departed from Lagos, Lagos Colony for Hamburg, Germany. No further trace, reported missing. |
| Margarethe | Germany | The schooner was driven ashore on Terschelling, Friesland, Netherlands. Her crew were rescued. She was on a voyage from Grangemouth, Stirlingshire, United Kingdom to Leer. |
| Majorian | United Kingdom | The ship was driven ashore on Great Cumbrae, Argyllshire. She was on a voyage from Glasgow, Renfrewshire to Dundee, Forfarshire. She was refloated the next day with assistance from Flying Spray (United Kingdom) and towed in to Rothesay Bay. |
| Patentia | Norway | The ship was wrecked on Ameland, Friesland. At least three of her crew survived. She was on a voyage from Fredrikstad to Purmerend, North Holland, Netherlands. |
| Several unnamed vessels | France | Four or five lighters were run into by the steamship Lotus (United Kingdom) and were severely damaged or sunk at Bordeaux, Gironde. |

== 17 October ==
List of shipwrecks: 17 October 1878
| Ship | State | Description |
|---|---|---|
| Ambrosia | Norway | The barque, which had lost three masts and shipped water during a hurricane two days previous, and was abandoned in the Atlantic Ocean. The crew was taken off by the brigantine Rio (Germany). Ambrosia was en route from Philadelphia, Pennsylvania, United States to Bremen, Germany. |
| Amsterdam | Netherlands | The steamship ran aground in the Maas. She was on a voyage from Grangemouth, Stirlingshire, United Kingdom to Rotterdam, South Holland. |
| Callao | United States | The brigantine was abandoned in the Atlantic Ocean (38°33′N 49°54′W). Her crew were rescued by the barque Arendal (Norway). Callao was on a voyage from Philadelphia, Pennsylvania to Palermo Sicily, Italy. |
| Greenbury Willey | United States | The schooner broke the anchor chains and drifted ashore on Long Island, New York on the south side of the Main Inlet in heavy seas near Life Saving Station No. 36, 3rd District, she was a total loss. Her crew of five was rescued by the United States Life Saving Service. |
| J. G. Coleson | New Zealand | The 70-ton schooner foundered after hitting rocks near D'Urville Island in Cook Strait during a strong gale, and was abandoned. All hands survived. |
| Josephine | France | The ship was driven ashore and sank at "Siguilkar". She was on a voyage from Hull, Yorkshire to Gävle, Sweden. |
| Red Cross | United Kingdom | The barque was beached near Ballinskelligs, County Kerry. Her nineteen crew survived. She was on a voyage from Liverpool, Lancashire to New York City, United States. |
| S. W. Kelly | United Kingdom | The steamship ran aground at Dunkirk, Nord, France. She was on a voyage from Odesa, Russia to Dunkirk. She was refloated the next day. |

== 18 October ==
List of shipwrecks: 18 October 1878
| Ship | State | Description |
|---|---|---|
| Alsace Lorraine | France | The ship departed from Ipswich, Suffolk, United Kingdom for Point aux Herbes, Texas, United States. No further trace. |
| Chalk | United Kingdom | The Thames barge was run down and sunk at Gravesend, Kent by the steamship Teal (United Kingdom). Her crew survived. |
| Daniel Lyons | United States | The schooner was in collision with the schooner Kate Gillett(United States) off Algoma, Wisconsin, and sank. There was no loss of life. |
| RMS Elbe | United Kingdom | The steamship ran aground on the Pillar Shoal, in the English Channel off Selsey, Sussex. She was on a voyage from Havre de Grâce, Seine-Inférieure, France to Southampton, Hampshire. She was refloated the next day and resumed her voyage. |
| Harry Fisher | United Kingdom | The steamship ran aground at "Reefness". She was on a voyage from Copenhagen to Korsør, Denmark. She was refloated. |
| John Bramall | United Kingdom | The steamship was wrecked on the Little Gull Island Rocks, in Long Island Sound. all on board were rescued. She was on a voyage from Newhaven, Connecticut, United States to Constantinople, Ottoman Empire. |
| John Susan | United Kingdom | The schooner sprang a leak and foundered 20 nautical miles (37 km) south by east of St. Ann's Head, Pembrokeshire. Her crew survived. She was on a voyage from Newport, Monmouthshire to Cork. |
| Peter Ritter | United States | The schooner ran aground on Long Island, New York one mile (1.6 km) west of the Eaton's Neck, New York Life Saving Station No. 38, 3rd District. Refloated on 22 October. |
| Udea | United Kingdom | The steam collier capsized at Bromborough, Cheshire. She was refloated on 24 October and taken in to Liverpool, Lancashire. |
| Victoria | United Kingdom | The schooner ran aground on the Cannon Rock, in the Belfast Lough. She was on a voyage from Troon, Ayrshire to Trinidad. She was refloated and taken in to Belfast, County Antrim in a leaky condition. |

== 19 October ==
List of shipwrecks: 19 October 1878
| Ship | State | Description |
|---|---|---|
| Corisande | Canada | The ship ran aground at the mouth of the Old Calabar River and was abandoned by her crew. She was on a voyage from Liverpool, Lancashire, United Kingdom to Old Calabar, Africa. |

== 20 October ==
List of shipwrecks: 20 October 1878
| Ship | State | Description |
|---|---|---|
| Aetna | United States | The schooner foundered in Lake Michigan near Two Rivers, Wisconsin. She was declared a total loss. |
| Granton | Russia | The barque was abandoned off Cape Finisterre, Spain. Her crew were rescued by Victor ( (Russian Empire) Grand Duchy of Finland). Granton was on a voyage from Cardiff, Glamorgan and Ferrol, Spain to Rio de Janeiro, Brazil. |
| Hermann Sauber | Germany | The steamship departed from Sunderland, County Durham, United Kingdom for Hamburg. No further trace, reported missing. |
| Nelson | United Kingdom | The brigantine was abandoned in the Atlantic Ocean (40°40′N 45°39′W). Her crew were rescued by the barque Ferdinand (Germany). Nelson was on a voyage from Puerto Cabello, Venezuela to Swansea, Glamorgan. |
| Venezia | Italy | The steamship was driven ashore at North Sydney, Nova Scotia, Canada. She was on a voyage from Montreal, Quebec, Canada to Saint John's, Newfoundland Colony. |

== 21 October ==
List of shipwrecks: 21 October 1878
| Ship | State | Description |
|---|---|---|
| Catherine | Netherlands | The ship was sighted off Anjer, Netherlands East Indies whilst on a voyage from Samarang, Netherlands East Indies to Amsterdam, North Holland. No further trace, reported overdue. |
| Champion, and Stad Vlissingen | United Kingdom; Netherlands | The schooner Champion was run into and sunk off the North Foreland, Kent by the paddle steamer Stad Vlissingen. Her crew were rescued by the paddle steamer. Stad Vlissingen was on a voyage from Queenborough, Kent to Vlissingen, Zeeland. She was severely damaged and was towed back to Queenborough by the paddle steamer Prinses Marie (Netherlands). |
| Fix | Norway | The brigantine was abandoned in the Atlantic Ocean (33°53′N 56°06′W). Her crew were rescued by J. Llewellyn (United Kingdom). Fix was on a voyage from New York, United States to Valencia, Spain. |
| Inconstant | United Kingdom | The schooner was run into by the steamship Agnes and Louisa (United Kingdom) off Flamborough Head, Yorkshire and was severely damaged. She was towed in to North Shields, Northumberland by Agnes and Louisa. |
| Odin | Norway | The brig was wrecked on Morte Point, Devon, United Kingdom. Her nine crew survive. She was on a voyage from Arendal to Llanelly, Glamorgan. |
| Pandora | United Kingdom | The schooner was driven ashore and wrecked at Bocas, United States of Colombia. All on board were rescued. |

== 22 October ==
List of shipwrecks: 22 October 1878
| Ship | State | Description |
|---|---|---|
| Altoona | United States | Gale of 1878: The schooner ran aground one mile (1.6 km) south of Cape Hatteras, North Carolina. She was a total loss. |
| City of Auckland | United Kingdom | The full-rigged ship went ashore near Otaki. The captain mistook the northern tip of Kapiti Island for Stephens Island during a gale and low visibility, making him think he was at the entrance to Cook Strait. The ship became a total wreck but all 245 passengers, and her crew, were saved. She was on a voyage from London to Napier and Wellington, New Zealand. |
| Confederation | United Kingdom | The ship was driven ashore at Larne, County Antrim. She was on a voyage from Newport, Monmouthshire to Londonderry. |
| County of Ayr | United Kingdom | The barque was driven ashore at "Purmerend", Netherlands East Indies. She was on a voyage from Batavia to Surabaya. She was refloated and resumed her voyage. |
| Dagmar | Russia | Gale of 1878: The full-rigged ship was damaged at Philadelphia, Pennsylvania, United States. |
| Dagmar | United Kingdom | The brig was driven ashore on Gotland, Sweden. She was later refloated. |
| Donald McKay, and George M. Barnard | United Kingdom; United States | Gale of 1878: The full-rigged ship collided with the barque George M. Barnard. Both vessels were severely damaged. |
| Foyle Packet | United Kingdom | The collier, a schooner was driven ashore at Queenstown, County Cork. |
| Industry | Germany | The ship was driven ashore on Læsø, Denmark. She was on a voyage from Newcastle upon Tyne, Northumberland, United Kingdom to Fehmarn. She was refloated and taken in to Fredrikshavn, Denmark in a leaky condition. |
| Jeannie Douglas | United Kingdom | The ship was sighted in the Indian Ocean whilst of a voyage from Bassein, India to the English Channel. No further trace, presumed foundered with the loss of all hands. |
| John Barbour | Canada | Gale of 1878: The ship was driven ashore and wrecked at Lewes, Delaware, United States. |
| Julius Caesar | Sweden | The steamship was driven ashore on Skagen, Denmark. |
| Lindisfarne | United Kingdom | The steamship was sighted off Helsingør, Denmark whilst on a voyage from Riga, Russia to London. No further trace, presumed foundered with the loss of all 21 crew. |
| Livadia | Imperial Russian Navy | Fragment of the painting Wreck of Livadia by Alexey Bogolyubov. The Imperial yacht foundered in dense fog during a southeast gale and was wrecked during the night of 21–22 October on rocks on the coast of Crimea in the Black Sea. The Grand Duke Sergius, his officers and crew survived. |
| Magnolia | United States | Gale of 1878: The schooner was wrecked in Albemarle Sound. Her captain drowned. |
| Martha | United Kingdom | Gale of 1878: The barque was abandoned in the Atlantic Ocean. Her crew were rescued. She was on a voyage from the Bull River to Newcastle upon Tyne, Northumberland. |
| Nona | Germany | The steamship collided with a barge and was beached at Taganrog, Russia. She had been refloated by 8 November and was subsequently taken in to Constantinople, Ottoman Empire for repairs. |
| Orange Girl | United Kingdom | The schooner ran aground on the Doom Bar. She was on a voyage from Swansea, Glamorgan to Cádiz, Spain. She was refloated and taken in to Padstow, Cornwall. |
| Preussischer Adler | United Kingdom | The steamship ran aground in the River Lee at the Blackrock Castle, County Cork. She was refloated the next day with the assistance of tugs. |
| Rosa C | Italy | The barque ran aground in the River Lee near the Blackrock Castle. She was refloated. |
| Sunbeam | United Kingdom | Gale of 1878: The barque was driven against the quayside and severely damaged at Philadelphia. |

== 23 October ==
List of shipwrecks: 23 October 1878
| Ship | State | Description |
|---|---|---|
| Adrienne | United States | Gale of 1878: The sloop went ashore at Short Beach, New Jersey near Life Saving Station No. 23, 4th District. Refloated later. A man, his wife and little girl were rescued by the United States Life Saving Service. |
| A. S. Davis | United States | A. S. Davis Gale of 1878: The sailing ship ran aground and immediately broke up at Virginia Beach, Virginia. Nineteen crewmen died, one survived and made it to shore. She was on a voyage from Pabellón da Pica, Peru to Norfolk, Virginia. |
| Augusta | Germany | The steamship was driven ashore at Smygehamn, Sweden. She was on a voyage from Danzig to Rotterdam, South Holland, Netherlands. She was declared a total loss, but was towed in to Copenhagen, Denmark on 25 October in a leaky condition. |
| Auguste | United Kingdom | The steamship was driven ashore near Trelleborg, Sweden. |
| Buckeye | United States | Gale of 1878: The vessel foundered off Tasker's Iron Works on Pea Patch Island near Fort Delaware. Her captain, his two sons, and a couple died, one crewman survived. |
| Captain Ray | United States | Gale of 1878: The schooner was driven ashore near the Range Rear Lighthouse, Delaware. |
| Chambers | United States | Gale of 1878: The schooner was driven ashore in a field near the Range Rear Lighthouse and was almost sailed back before the dropping storm surge left it stranded. |
| City of Houston | United States | Gale of 1878: The steamship foundered off the Frying Pan Shoals after being abandoned by her crew. She was on a voyage from New York to Galveston, Texas. |
| Corry | United States | Gale of 1878: The schooner was driven ashore near the Range Rear Lighthouse. |
| D. P. Phillips | United States | Gale of 1878: The schooner was wrecked 6 nautical miles (11 km) below Cape Henlopen, Delaware. Five crewmen were killed, two made it to shore on their own. |
| E. K. Kane | United States | Gale of 1878: The scow lost her steering and went ashore 3 1/2 nautical miles (6.5 km) from Life Saving Station No. 1, 10th District in a gale and heavy seas and broke up. Her crew of five was rescued by the United States Life Saving Service. |
| Eliza Godfrey | United States | Gale of 1878: The schooner went ashore on Pea Patch Island, Delaware. |
| Ely Rise | United Kingdom | The steamship grounded on the Hats, in the Isles of Scilly and became waterlogged. There was no loss of life. She was on a voyage from Cardiff, Glamorgan to Savannah, Georgia, United States. She was refloated on 29 October with assistance from the steamship Recovery (United Kingdom) and towed in to Plymouth, Devon. |
| Emma | United States | Gale of 1878: The tug was holed and sank at Delaware City, Delaware. Raised on 27 October and sent for repairs. |
| Estelle Bright | United States | Gale of 1878: The ship was wrecked opposite New Castle, Delaware. Three aboard died. |
| Express | United States | Gale of 1878: The steamship capsized and sank in Chesapeake Bay near Point No Light, Maryland and/or Barren Island, Maryland with the loss of 24 of the 39 people on board. Some of the survivors were rescued by a boat from Shirley (United States) that was already aground. Express was on a voyage from Baltimore, Maryland to Washington D. C. |
| Fanny Bliss | United States | Gale of 1878: The schooner went ashore on Pea Patch Island. |
| Florence Witherbee | United States | Gale of 1878: The steamship went ashore, location unknown. |
| General Barnes | United States | Gale of 1878: The steamship foundered off Cape Hatteras. All on board were rescued. She was on a voyage from Savannah, Georgia to New York. |
| H. F. Potter | United States | Gale of 1878: The schooner was wrecked at Five-Mile Beach, New Jersey 1 nautical mile (1.9 km) south of Hereford Shoal. Two crewmen were killed, four were rescued by the United States Life Saving Service. |
| H. P. Laws | United States | Gale of 1878: The schooner went ashore in the marshes near Milford, Delaware. |
| Helen | United States | Gale of 1878: The sloop was wrecked in the vicinity of League Island, Pennsylvania. |
| Hugh Cann | Canada | The barque ran aground at Harwich, Essex, United Kingdom. She was on a voyage from Philadelphia, Pennsylvania, United States to Ipswich, Suffolk, United Kingdom. She was refloated and taken in to Harwich. |
| Hugh McFadden | United States | Gale of 1878: The tug sank off Cherry Island, Delaware. |
| Ide | United States | Gale of 1878: The steamship went aground on the coast of Massachusetts. |
| J. Dever | United States | Gale of 1878: The schooner capsized in the Christiana River. Two crewmen were killed. |
| James McFadden | United States | Gale of 1878: The tug sank at the Railroad Wharf in New Castle, Delaware. |
| John Russell | United States | Gale of 1878: The schooner was driven ashore in St. Jerome's Bay, just north of the mouth of the Potomac River, in Chesapeake Bay ending up stranded in a cornfield. |
| Joseph Fitch | United States | Gale of 1878: The schooner went to pieces off Stonington, Massachusetts. |
| Julia | United States | Gale of 1878: The schooner was driven ashore a few miles from "Sedge Island". |
| Lestris | United Kingdom | The steamship ran aground at Besika Point, Ottoman Empire. She was on a voyage from Galaţi, United Principalities to Ragusa, Austria-Hungary. She was refloated on 26 October with assistance from HMS Pallas (Royal Navy). |
| Louisa | United States | Gale of 1878: The steamship went aground on Middle Ground. |
| Mary A. Mott | United States | Gale of 1878: The schooner broke loose from her moorings and washed ashore in a meadow 1 nautical mile (1.9 km) north of Life Saving Station No. 17, 4th District. She was refloated on 25 October. |
| Mary Tyce | United States | Gale of 1878: The schooner was wrecked off the Harbour of New Haven, Connecticut. Two killed. |
| Massachusetts | United States | Gale of 1878: The steamship went ashore at Drum Point, New York. |
| Matilda | United States | Gale of 1878: The steamship was last sighted in Chesapeake Bay on this date. Presumed foundered wit6h the loss of all sixteen crew. |
| Nora | United Kingdom | The ship grounded on the Horsebank, in the Irish Sea off Southport, Lancashire. She was on a voyage from Ardrossan, Ayrshire to Newport, Monmouthshire. |
| Peri | United Kingdom | The ship was wrecked at Breaker Point, China. Her crew were rescued. She was on a voyage from Hong Kong to Niuzhuang, China. |
| Perlos II | Spain | The schooner was towed in to Plymouth, Devon, United Kingdom in a waterlogged condition. She was on a voyage from Cardiff to Bordeaux, Gironde, France. She capsized the next day but was righted. |
| Rattlesnake | United States | Gale of 1878: The collier went ashore 500 yards (460 m) inland in Delaware Bay. |
| Rotterdam | Netherlands | The steamship ran aground off Goeree, Zeeland. She was on a voyage from New York City, United States to Rotterdam. She was refloated the next day and completed her voyage. |
| Samuel Carlton | United States | Gale of 1878: The schooner grounded on the north shore of the Barnegat Inlet, New Jersey. She was refloated on 26 or 27 October. |
| Sarah B. | United States | Gale of 1878: The schooner went ashore on the coast of New Jersey near Life Saving Station No. 24, 4th District. She was refloated on 24 October. |
| Sarah Clark | United States | Gale of 1878: The schooner capsized, but righted and went ashore 1 nautical mile (1.9 km) east of the No. 31 life Saving Station near Peck's Beach, New Jersey. Four crewmen were killed, four were rescued by the United States Life Saving Service. |
| Scribner | United States | Gale of 1878: The canal boat sank off Eddystone, Pennsylvania. |
| Seaward | United Kingdom | The schooner collided with the schooner Emrys (United Kingdom) and was severely damaged at Tralee, County Kerry. It was feared that she would sink. |
| Shirley | United States | Gale of 1878: The steamship was driven ashore on Barren Island, Maryland. |
| Snow Flake | United States | Gale of 1878: The sloop capsized in the Delaware River off Fort Delaware with the loss of one life. |
| Stannington | United Kingdom | The steamship ran aground at Saint Helier, Jersey, Channel Islands and was damaged. She was on a voyage from London to Saint Helier. |
| Star | Canada | Gale of 1878: The schooner was swamped and sank in a gale 1,000 feet (300 m) from the entrance to the harbor of Charlotte, New York. She later broke up. All seven crew members were rescued by the United States Life Saving Service. |
| Stratton | United States | Gale of 1878: The schooner went ashore where she got sucked into a flume that pumps water from the river to the mill wrecking herself and the pumphouse of the Eddystone, Pennsylvania Print Works. |
| Svalen | Norway | The barque ran aground on the Shipwash Sand, in the North Sea off the coast of Suffolk. She was on a voyage from New York City to Ipswich. She was refloated. |
| Triton | United Kingdom | The steamship ran aground at Sunderland, County Durham. She was on a voyage from Gothenburg, Sweden to Sunderland. She was refloated and taken in to Sunderland. |
| Virgin de las Nievis | Spain | Gale of 1878: The barque went ashore 2 1/2 nautical miles (4.6 km) south of the House of Refuge No. 3, 7th District on the coast of Florida in a gale and was wrecked with the loss of two of her thirteen crew. |
| Water Witch | United States | Gale of 1878: The yacht broke loose from her moorings and sank after colliding with a canal boat at Wilmington, Delaware. |
| William Collyer | United States | Gale of 1878: The schooner went ashore 6 nautical miles (11 km) south of Barnegat, New Jersey and was lost. Her crew of five was rescued by the United States Life Saving Service. |
| W. P. Bolton | United States | Gale of 1878: The tug was wrecked near the Port Penn lighthouse. Her captain and a boy passenger were killed. |
| Unnamed | United States | Gale of 1878: The barge sank in the Hudson River at New York City. Several lives were lost. |
| Two unnamed vessels | United States | Gale of 1878: Two brigs capsized at Point Breeze, Philadelphia, Pennsylvania. |
| Nine unnamed vessels | United States | Gale of 1878: The canal boats were sunk at Pottstown, Pennsylvania. |
| Unnamed | United States | Gale of 1878: The oyster boat was driven ashore in full sail without a crew below Marcus Hook, Pennsylvania. |
| 24 Unnamed vessels | United States | Gale of 1878: The oyster boats were sunk at Clayton, Delaware. |
| Unnamed | United States | Gale of 1878: The schooner was driven into the woods on the shore of Maryland. |
| Unnamed | United States | Gale of 1878: The schooner was wrecked at Erie, Pennsylvania. |
| Unnamed | United States | Gale of 1878: The schooner capsized at Reed Street Wharf, Philadelphia, Pennsylvania. |
| Unnamed | United States | Gale of 1878: The schooner was dismasted at Reed Street Wharf, Philadelphia. |
| 23 unnamed vessels | United States | Gale of 1878: The schooners went aground on the coast of Massachusetts. |
| Unnamed | United States | Gale of 1878: The scow broke up at Jefferson's Wharf, New Castle, Delaware. |
| Unnamed | United States | Gale of 1878: The ship capsized at Reed Street Wharf, Philadelphia. |
| Many unnamed vessels | United States | Gale of 1878: Four or five steamships and many schooners were driven ashore in St. Jerome's Bay, just north of the mouth of the Potomac River, in Chesapeake Bay. |
| Unnamed | United States | The ship foundered off Cape Henry, Virginia with the loss of eighteen lives. |

== 24 October ==
List of shipwrecks: 24 October 1878
| Ship | State | Description |
|---|---|---|
| Alice Roy | United States | The barque was damaged in a gale at Philadelphia, Pennsylvania. |
| Buteshire | United Kingdom | The steamship ran aground at Chiaranza Point, Greece. She was on a voyage from Patras to "Chicacola". She was refloated and taken in to "Chicacola". |
| Calais-Douvres | United Kingdom | The steamship ran aground at Calais, France. She was on a voyage from Calais to Dover, Kent. She was refloated the next day and resumed her voyage. |
| Carl Martins | Denmark | The ship ran aground at Harwich, Essex, United Kingdom. She was on a voyage from the Masnedsund to Ipswich, Suffolk, United Kingdom. |
| Charles | United Kingdom | The Thames barge was driven ashore and wrecked at Eastbourne, Sussex. Her crew were rescued. She was on a voyage from Portland, Dorset to London. |
| Donald McKay, and G. M. Barnard | United Kingdom; United States | The full-rigged ship Donald McKay and barque G. M. Barnard collided in a gale at Philadelphia. Both vessels were severely damaged. |
| Easterhill | United Kingdom | The barque ran aground on The Shingles, off the Isle of Wight. She was on a voyage from London to Otago, New Zealand. She was refloated and taken in to Yarmouth, Isle of Wight. |
| Elvira | United Kingdom | The brig struck the Whitby Rock. She put back to Sunderland, County Durham. |
| Eustace | United Kingdom | The fishing smack fouled the nets of William and collided with Try (both United Kingdom) and sank in the North Sea 27 nautical miles (50 km) north east of Gret Yarmouth, Norfolk. |
| Fuschia | United Kingdom | The brig was wrecked on the Scroby Sands, Norfolk. Her six crew were rescued by the Gorleston Lifeboat. She was on a voyage from Southampton, Hampshire to Sunderland, County Durham. |
| Ligurian | United Kingdom | The steamship was driven ashore at Trieste. She was on a voyage from Trieste to Liverpool, Lancashire. She was refloated on 26 October with assistance from Anatolian (United Kingdom) and was taken in to Venice. |
| Medford | United States | The barque was damaged in a gale at Philadelphia. |
| Nova Scotia | United Kingdom | The ship ran aground on the Hompelvoet Bank, off the coast of Zeeland, Netherlands. She was on a voyage from Philadelphia to Rotterdam, South Holland, Netherlands. She was refloated with assistance. |
| Panormos | Italy | The steamship was wrecked on Makronisi, Greece. She was on a voyage from Piraeus to Thessaloniki, Greece. |
| Queen Anne | United Kingdom | The steamship ran aground in the Hooghly River. She was on a voyage from London to Calcutta, India. She was refloated and resumed her voyage. |
| Ruth | United Kingdom | The ship sank in the River Thames during a squall. Her crew survived; her captain was rescued by Castalia (United Kingdom). |
| Stadt | Flag unknown | The ship was driven ashore at Lewes, Delaware, United States. She was on a voyage from Philadelphia to Dieppe, Seine-Inférieure, France. She had been refloated by 23 November. She was consequently condemned. |
| Superb | United Kingdom | The ship foundered in the North Sea. Her crew were rescued. She was on a voyage from Hamburg, Germany to Santos, Brazil. |
| Whim | United Kingdom | The schooner was driven ashore and wrecked on Petrie's Ledge, off North Sydney, Nova Scotia, Canada. She was refloated on 28 October. |
| W. H. Jenkins | United Kingdom | The ship ran aground on a sandbank off the cost of Zeeland, Netherlands. She was on a voyage from Philadelphia, Pennsylvania to Rotterdam, South Holland, Netherlands. She was refloated. |

== 25 October ==
List of shipwrecks: 25 October 1878
| Ship | State | Description |
|---|---|---|
| Dahlia | United Kingdom | The steamship sprang a leak and was beached at Leith, Lothian. She was on a voyage from Leith to Middlesbrough, Yorkshire. |
| Enterprise | United Kingdom | The ship was driven ashore between Kingsdown and St. Margaret's Bay, Kent with the loss of four of her crew. She was on a voyage from London to Cardiff, Glamorgan. |
| Erol | United Kingdom | The barque departed from New York, United States for Cette, Hérault, France. No further trace, presumed foundered with the loss of all hands. |
| Helgoland | Austria-Hungary | The barque was driven into by the barque Eintracht (Germany) and went ashore at Bordeaux, Gironde, France. |
| John | Russia | The brigantine was driven ashore on Hiiumaa. |
| Nordlyset | Norway | The barque sprang a leak and sank off Lindesnes. Her crew were rescued by the barque Therese (Germany). Nordlyset was on a voyage from Middlesbrough to Arendal. |
| Seraphina | United Kingdom | The brig was driven ashore and sank at Kragerø, Norway. Her crew were rescued. She was on a voyage from London to Frederikshald, Norway. |
| Three Brothers | United Kingdom | The ketch was driven ashore in the Cattewater. She was on a voyage from Pwllheli, Caernarfonshire to London. She was refloated and taken in to Sutton Pool in a leaky condition. |

== 26 October ==
List of shipwrecks: 26 October 1878
| Ship | State | Description |
|---|---|---|
| Concord | United Kingdom | The brig ran aground on the Gunfleet Sand, in the North Sea off the coast of Essex. She was on a voyage from Middlesbrough, Yorkshire to Gravesend, Kent. She was refloated and completed her voyage. |
| Doro | United Kingdom | The steamship ran aground at Nicholaieff, Russia. She was refloated and taken in to Nicholaieff. |
| Fanny Beck | United Kingdom | The schooner ran aground on the Sunk Sand, in the North Sea off the coast of Essex. She was on a voyage from Newcastle upon Tyne, Northumberland to Seville, Spain. She was refloated and taken in to Harwich, Essex in a waterlogged condition. |
| Hermod | Norway | The barque was driven against the quayside at Norfolk, Virginia, United States and was damaged. |
| Hilkeline Gerhardine | Flag unknown | The ship was abandoned in the Skaggerak. Her crew were rescued. She was on a voyage from Riga, Russia to Leith, Lothian, United Kingdom. She was driven ashore on Gullholmen in a derelict and waterlogged condition. |
| Leader | United Kingdom | The ship was sighted off the Isle of Wight whilst on a voyage from Lisbon, Portugal to Hull, Yorkshire. No further trace. |
| Queen Anne | United Kingdom | The steamship ran aground and capsized in the Hooghly River with the loss of at least two lives. Survivors were rescued by the tug Columbia (India). Queen Anne was on a voyage from London to Calcutta, India. |
| Willie | United Kingdom | The tug was run down and sunk by the steamship Britannic (United Kingdom) at Wapping, Middlesex. Her crew were rescued. |
| Unnamed | Flag unknown | The brigantine ran aground on the Gunfleet Sand. |

== 27 October ==
List of shipwrecks: 27 October 1878
| Ship | State | Description |
|---|---|---|
| Cobden | United Kingdom | The steamship ran aground in the River Thames at Greenhithe, Kent. She was on a voyage from London to Middlesbrough, Yorkshire. She was refloated with the assistance of a tug and resumed her voyage. |
| Emmie | United Kingdom | The ship was driven ashore at "Steensnæs", Denmark. She was on a voyage from Aarhus, Denmark to Stockton-on-Tees, County Durham. She was refloated. |
| Maggie Robertson | New Zealand | The 16-ton schooner foundered near Great Barrier Island in the Hauraki Gulf after springing a leak. All hands survived. |
| Seventeen ships | United States | Gale of 1878 :The ships sank in the river at Philadelphia, Pennsylvania. |

== 28 October ==
List of shipwrecks: 28 October 1878
| Ship | State | Description |
|---|---|---|
| Antias | United Kingdom | The brig was run down and sunk at the Nore by the steamship Dithmarschen (Germany). Her crew were rescued. |
| Hilda | Norway | The brig was driven ashore at Cushendall, County Antrim, United Kingdom. Her crew survived. She was on a voyage from Troon, Ayrshire, United Kingdom to Christiania. She was refloated on 11 November and taken in to Red Bay, County Antrim. |
| Falucha Chispa | (Spain) | The revenue cutter was wrecked on the Aceitea Reef, off Conil de la Frontera with the loss of all but one of her fifteen crew. |
| Hilkeline Gerhardine | Flag unknown | The ship was driven ashore on Gullholmen, Sweden. She was on a voyage from Riga, Russia to Leith, Lothian, United Kingdom. |
| Jantina Christina | Germany | The ship was driven ashore at "Castle Point", Denmark. |
| J. P. Taylor | United Kingdom | The ship was damaged by fire at Bremen, Germany. She was on a voyage from Newcastle upon Tyne, Northumberland to Brake, Germany. |
| Manora | United Kingdom | The steamship ran aground at Shanklin, Isle of Wight. She was on a voyage from London to Calcutta, India. She was refloated. |
| Persia | United States | The schooner stranded in a gale and heavy seas 1/2 nautical mile (0.93 km) south of the pier at Grand Haven, Michigan. Her crew made it to shore on their own. |
| Presto | United States | The schooner stranded in a gale and heavy seas 50 yards (46 m) north of the pier at Grand Haven. She was scuttled to minimize damage. Her crew rescued by the United States Life Saving Service. |
| Tokushima Maru | Japan | The steamship sank after gunpowder exploded, or a boiler burst, while the ship was off Tonda (reports vary). Eighty-three passengers and twelve crew or, fifty-six passengers and fourteen crew were killed on the ferry which carried passengers and cargo between Osaka and Awa. |
| Two unnamed vessels | Flags unknown | The barques sank in Lake Constance. Their crews were rescued by a steamship. |

== 29 October ==
List of shipwrecks: 29 October 1878
| Ship | State | Description |
|---|---|---|
| Alice | Belgium | The steamship sprang a leak and foundered off Franco Point, Spain. She was on a voyage from Bilbao, Spain to Antwerp. |
| Celura | United Kingdom | The ship ran aground on the Cross Sand, in the North Sea off the coast of Norfolk. She was on a voyage from Alloa, Clackmannanshire to Demerara, British Guiana. She was refloated and assisted in to Great Yarmouth, Norfolk. |
| Elizabeth | United Kingdom | The ship was driven ashore 6 nautical miles (11 km) South of Bridlington, Yorkshire. Her crew were rescued. She was on a voyage from Southampton, Hampshire to Sunderland, County Durham. |
| Ingleborg | Sweden | The sloop was abandoned in the Baltic Sea. Her crew were rescued. She was on a voyage from Kalmar to London, United Kingdom. |
| J. M. Stevens | United Kingdom | The ship ran aground off the Mumbles, Glamorgan. She was on a voyage from Neath, Glamorgan to Dublin. She was refloated the next day with assistance from the tug Digby Grand (United Kingdom and beached. |
| Mary Kate | United Kingdom | The brigantine was driven ashore at Port Erin, Isle of Man. |
| Nith | United Kingdom | The steamship sank off the Curran Pier. She was on a voyage from Ayr to Larne, County Antrim. She was refloated on 5 December and taken in to Larne. |
| Smithfield | United Kingdom | The schooner was wrecked on the Haisborough Sands, in the North Sea off the coast of Norfolk. Her six crew were rescued by the Palling Lifeboat British Workman ( Royal National Lifeboat Institution). Smithfield was on a voyage from Aberdeen to London. |
| Tickler | United Kingdom | The dandy sank off Horseshoe Point, Lincolnshire with the loss of all five crew. |

== 30 October ==
List of shipwrecks: 30 October 1878
| Ship | State | Description |
|---|---|---|
| Ann and Jane | United Kingdom | The ship ran aground at Calais, France and became waterlogged. She was on a voyage from King's Lynn, Norfolk to Calais. |
| Alma | Germany | The brig was wrecked 16 nautical miles (30 km) east of East London, Cape Colony. |
| Edward | United Kingdom | The schooner collided with the steamship Edward (United Kingdom) in the River Thames at Charlton, Kent and was severely damaged. She was beached at Silvertown, Essex. |
| Flora | France | The schooner was driven ashore and wrecked at Saint-Malo, Ille-et-Vilaine. Her crew were rescued. |
| Jane Cargill | United Kingdom | The schooner struck the Smithie Sand, in the North Sea off the coast of Yorkshire and sank. Her crew survived. She was on a voyage from Sunderland, County Durham to Gothenburg, Sweden. |
| Longest Day | United Kingdom | The barge capsized and sank at Portsmouth, Hampshire. Her three crew were rescued. |
| May | Norway | The barque ran aground in the River Carron. She was on a voyage from Grangemouth, Stirlingshire, United Kingdom to Mandal, Norway. |
| Perla II | Spain | The schooner put in to Falmouth, Cornwall, United Kingdom in a waterlogged condition and subsequently sank. She was on a voyage from A Coruña to Cardiff, Glamorgan, United Kingdom. She was refloated. |
| Prince Oscar | United Kingdom | The ship ran aground in the Karnaphuli. She was on a voyage from Chittagong, India to London. |
| Remus | United Kingdom | The steamship was driven ashore. She was on a voyage from New Orleans, Louisiana, United States to Antwerp, Belgium. She was refloated and put back to New Orleans. |
| Rokeby | United Kingdom | The steamship ran aground on the Goodwin Sands, Kent. She was on a voyage from Newcastle upon Tyne, Northumberland to Odesa, Russia. She was refloated with assistance from the lugger Champion (United Kingdom). and taken in to The Downs. |
| Roseneath | United Kingdom | The schooner was wrecked on Craignure Point, Isle of Mull. She was on a voyage from a Russian port to Greenock, Renfrewshire. |
| Unnamed | United Kingdom | The fishing lugger was run down and sunk off Orfordness, Suffolk by the steamship Kaffraria (United Kingdom). Her crew were rescued by Kaffraria. |
| Unnamed | Flag unknown | The ship was wrecked on the Domesnes Reef, in the Gulf of Riga with the loss of all hands. |

== 31 October ==
List of shipwrecks: 31 October 1878
| Ship | State | Description |
|---|---|---|
| Areta | United Kingdom | The brig was wrecked at Ter Heiden, South Holland, Netherlands with the loss of all hands. She was on a voyage from Whitby, Yorkshire to Rotterdam, South Holland. |
| HMRC Fanny | Board of Customs | The cutter sank after colliding with the steamship Helvetia (United Kingdom) off the Tuscar Lighthouse with the loss of seventeen of her 24 crew. Survivors were rescued by Helvetia. HMRC Fanny was on a voyage from Queenstown, County Cork to Dublin. |
| Fern Sodskende | Sweden | The ship was driven ashore and wrecked at Scheveningen, South Holland. Her crew were rescued. She was on a voyage from Saxkøbing, Denmark to Antwerp, Belgium. |
| J. H. Rutter | United States | The schooner was found in waterlogged condition and towed to an anchorage 1 nautical mile (1.9 km) north of Ludington, Michigan in heavy seas. A gale hit her during the night and she careened and sank on her side in 18 feet (5.5 m) of water about midnight. Her crew and laborers, 44 in all, were rescued by the tug Colonel Graham (United States) and the United States Life Saving Service during an all day rescue on 1 November. |
| Leander | United Kingdom | The ship was abandoned in the North Sea 50 nautical miles (93 km) off Great Yarmouth, Norfolk. Her crew were rescued by the smack Leander (United Kingdom). Leander was on a voyage from Randers, Denmark to London. |
| Liberta | Norway | The steamship ran aground at Falsterbo, Sweden. She was on a voyage from Bergen to Stettin, Germany. She was refloated with the assistance of a steamship on 2 November and taken in to Copenhagen, Denmark. |
| Mats | Norway | The brig was driven ashore east of Dunkirk, Nord, France. Her crew were rescued. |
| Providence | United Kingdom | The brigantine went ashore on the edge of the Middle Cross Sand, off Great Yarmouth and got off within ten minutes. The following morning, while being towed she struck the bar at the entrance to Great Yarmouth harbour. |

== Unknown date ==
List of shipwrecks: Unknown date in October 1878
| Ship | State | Description |
|---|---|---|
| Ada Fulton | Canada | The schooner was abandoned in the Atlantic Ocean before 8 October. |
| Annette | Norway | The barque was abandoned in the Atlantic Ocean before 26 October Her crew were rescued. |
| Anglo-Saxon | United Kingdom | The ship was abandoned in the Atlantic Ocean before 21 October. Her crew were rescued. She was on a voyage from Dublin to Quebec City, Canada. |
| Aron | Austria-Hungary | The barque was driven ashore and wrecked at Haugesund, Norway. She was on a voyage from Bremen, Germany to Bahia, Brazil. |
| Aurora | Sweden | The barque was driven ashore between "Tamal" and Samarang, Netherlands East Indies before 12 October. She was refloated and taken in to Batavia, Netherlands East Indies in a leaky condition. |
| City of Auckland | Flag unknown | The emigrant ship was wrecked at the entrance to the Cook Strait, near the village of Otaki, New Zealand. She was on a voyage from London, United Kingdom to Napier and Auckland. |
| City of Dublin | United Kingdom | The ship was driven ashore and wrecked in the Columbia River. Her crew were rescued. |
| City of Manitowoc | United States | The schooner was driven ashore on Anticosti Island, Nova Scotia, Canada. She was on a voyage from a port in Michigan to Liverpool, Lancashire, United Kingdom. She was refloated and resumed her voyage. |
| Cleopatra | United States | The steamship was driven ashore and severely damaged at Nassau, Bahamas. She was on a voyage from New York to Nassau. She was refloated. |
| Consul Platen | Germany | The barque was abandoned in the Atlantic Ocean. She was on a voyage from New York to Plymouth, Devon, United Kingdom. She was subsequently discovered by Bridgwater (United Kingdom), which put some of her crew aboard. They took her in to Queenstown, County Cork, United Kingdom, where she arrived on 21 October. |
| Economist | United Kingdom | The schooner foundered in Liverpool Bay. She was on a voyage from Galway to Liverpool, Lancashire. Wreckage washed up at Crosby, Lancashire. |
| Ernst | Germany | The barque was driven ashore on the north point of Öland, Sweden. She was on a voyage from Ljusne, Sweden to West Hartlepool, County Durham, United Kingdom. She was refloated with assistance from Poseidon (Sweden) and taken in to Oskarshamn, Sweden. |
| Evelyn | United Kingdom | The ship was abandoned off the Isles of Scilly before 12 October. |
| Fiducia | Netherlands | The brigantine foundered in the Atlantic Ocean before 26 October with some loss of life. She was on a voyage from the Rio Grande to the River Mersey. |
| Florence | United States | The brig caught fire at sea and was abandoned. She was on a voyage from Mobile, Alabama to Havre de Grâce, Seine-Inférieure, France. |
| Flying Scud | United Kingdom | The ship was driven ashore and wrecked at Niuzhuang, China. She was on a voyage from Nagasaki, Japan to Niuzhuang. |
| Free Trade | United States | The ship was abandoned at sea. She was on a voyage from Port Blakely, Washington to Melbourne, Victoria. |
| Georgia | United States | The ship was driven ashore 18 nautical miles (33 km) south of Punta Arenas, Chile. She was on a voyage from Panama City, United States of Colombia to San Francisco, California. She subsequently broke in two. |
| G. P. Payzant | United Kingdom | The ship was driven ashore on Navy Island, New Brunswick, Canada. She was on a voyage from Saint John, New Brunswick to Dublin. She was refloated and resumed her voyage. |
| Hope | United Kingdom | The ship ran aground on the Pickles Reef before 23 October. She was on a voyage from Belize City, British Honduras to Falmouth, Cornwall. She was later refloated and towed in to Key West, Florida, United States. |
| Jane Anna | United Kingdom | The ship was driven ashore and wrecked at North Cape, Prince Edward Island, Canada. She was on a voyage from Richibucto, New Brunswick to Dublin. |
| Jesse | Austria-Hungary | The barque was wrecked at "Orange", Africa before 24 October. |
| Joseph Budding | United States | The schooner was run down and sunk Chesapeake Bay by the steamship Howick (United Kingdom). Her crew were rescued by Howick. |
| J. P. Wheeler | United States | The full-rigged ship was abandoned in the Atlantic Ocean before 12 October. Her seventeen crew were rescued; nine by Edward O'Brien (United States) and eight by Elysia) (United Kingdom). J. P. Wheeler was on a voyage from Saint John, New Brunswick or Saint John's, Newfoundland Colony to Londonderry, United Kingdom. |
| Julius Cæsar | Sweden | The steamship was driven ashore on Skagen, Denmark before 22 October. She was later refloated and resumed her voyage. |
| Kate | United Kingdom | The ship was abandoned between 10 and 18 October. She was on a voyage from the Newfounland Colony to Quebec City. |
| Lady of the Lake | United Kingdom | The schooner departed from London for Anstruther, Fife in late October. No further trace, presumed foundered with the loss of all hands. |
| Lambton | United Kingdom | The steamship ran aground and sank in the Seine. |
| Manilla | United Kingdom | The barque capsized in the Baltic Sea in early October with the loss of eight of her ten crew. Survivors were rescued by the brig Juno (Flag unknown). Manilla was on a voyage from Riga, Russia to an English port. |
| Margarieta | United Kingdom | The ship was lost at sea. Her crew were rescued. She was on a voyage from London to Port Natal, Natal Colony. |
| Mary | United Kingdom | The schooner was driven ashore and wrecked 6 nautical miles (11 km) south of Detroit, Michigan, United States with the loss of four of her six crew. She was on a voyage from Chicago, Illinois, United States to Liverpool. |
| Mary E. Goodwin | United Kingdom | The barque was abandoned in the Atlantic Ocean before 24 October. Her crew were rescued by Mary Falconer (United Kingdom). Mary E. Goodwin was on a voyage from "Pooman" to Philadelphia. |
| M. Finkmar | Canada | The ship caught fire in the Atlantic Ocean before 23 October. |
| Midas | United States | The barque was wrecked. She was on a voyage from Antwerp, Belgium to Imbetiba, Brazil. |
| Monitor | United States | The barque was abandoned at sea with some loss of life. She was on a voyage from Caibarién, Cuba to New York. |
| Morton | United Kingdom | The schooner was abandoned in the Atlantic Ocean before 19 October. Her crew were rescued. |
| Olive Branch | United Kingdom | The barque caught fire at sea. She put in to Cape Town, Cape Colony on 20 October. She was on a voyage from South Shields, County Durham to Penang, Straits Settlements. |
| Orion | Norway | The ship foundered in the Atlantic Ocean. Her crew were rescued by Lady Octavia (United Kingdom). Orion was on a voyage from Miramichi, New Brunswick to Plymouth, Devon, United Kingdom. |
| Oude Pekela | Netherlands | The ship foundered. Her crew were rescued. She was on a voyage from London to the Natal Colony. |
| Progress | United Kingdom | The schooner was driven ashore at Castletown, Isle of Man. She was on a voyage from Stettin, Germany to Liverpool. |
| Ruby | Canada | The barque ran aground on the Burford Bank, in the River Liffey. She was on a voyage from an American port to Dublin. She was consequently condemned. |
| Samuel Locke | United Kingdom | The brig was lost before 17 October. She was on a voyage from Boston, Massachusetts, United States to Haiti. |
| San Carlos | Flag unknown | The ship collided with the steamship Blenheim (United Kingdom) and sank. Her crew were rescued. San Carlos was on a voyage from Glasgow, Renfrewshire to Demerara, British Guiana. |
| Souvenir | United Kingdom | The steam coaster was wrecked at St. Ann's Bay, Jamaica. |
| Stanley | Norway | The barque foundered at sea before 29 October. Her crew were rescued. |
| Star of Devon | United Kingdom | The barque ran aground in Mossel Bay before 11 October. She was refloated and found to be leaky. |
| Three Sisters | United Kingdom | The smack collided with another vessel and foundered in the North Sea before 26 October. Her crew were rescued. |
| Virgin de las Nieves | Spain | The ship was wrecked in the Florida Keys, United States with some loss of life. She was on a voyage from Caibarién to New York. |
| Vorobey | Russia | The transport ship foundered off Soukoum while carrying shot and powder from Nikolaev to Poti. Of the sixteen crew only the captain and one sailor was saved. |
| Yolande | United Kingdom | The lugger sank at Tenby, Pembrokeshire. |
| Unnamed | Flag unknown | The steamship ran aground in the Seine. She was refloated and resumed her voyage. |
