= List of shipwrecks in December 1855 =

The list of shipwrecks in December 1855 includes ships sunk, foundered, wrecked, grounded, or otherwise lost during December 1855.

== 1 December ==
List of shipwrecks: 1 December 1855
Ship	State	Description
Candace	United Kingdom	The ship was abandoned in the Atlantic Ocean off Cape Horn, Chile with the loss of a crew member. Survivors were rescued by Haidee (United Kingdom). Candace was on a voyage from London to Valparaíso, Chile.
Egsemunde	Flag unknown	The ship was driven ashore at Grimsby, Lincolnshire, United Kingdom. She was on a voyage from London to Hartlepool, County Durham, United Kingdom.
Gartsherrie	United Kingdom	The barque was wrecked on Crab Island, Puerto Rico. She was on a voyage from Saint Thomas, Danish West Indies, to Matanzas, Cuba.
Grange	United Kingdom	The ship was driven ashore at Grimsby. She was on a voyage from London to Hartlepool.
Jeune Anne	France	The ship was driven ashore at Grimsby. She was on a voyage from Abbeville, Somme to Middlesbrough, Yorkshire, United Kingdom.
Oneco	United Kingdom	The ship was abandoned in the Atlantic Ocean off St. Paul's Island, Brazil. Her crew were rescued by the whaler James Allen (United States). Oneco was on a voyage from Liverpool, Lancashire to Calcutta, India.
Rover	United Kingdom	The smack was driven ashore and wrecked at Scarborough, Yorkshire with the loss of her captain.

== 2 December ==
List of shipwrecks: 2 December 1855
Ship	State	Description
Geertina	Hamburg	The ship was driven ashore and wrecked on Borkum, Kingdom of Hanover. Her crew were rescued. She was on a voyage from a Scottish port to Hamburg.
Governor Oxholm	United States	The ship was wrecked at Bonaire, Curaçao and Dependencies. Her crew were rescued.
James Watt	United Kingdom	The ship was driven ashore east of "Revel", She was on a voyage from Lerwick, Shetland Islands to Danzig.
Oscar	United Kingdom	The ship was wrecked near the Landsort Lighthouse, Sweden.
Peter J. Nevins	United Kingdom	The ship collided with Actress (United Kingdom) and was abandoned in the Atlantic Ocean. Her crew were rescued by Miramichi ( (United Kingdom of Great Britain and Ireland) British North America. Peter J. Nevis was on a voyage from .
Robert Burrell	United Kingdom	The brig was in collision with the steamship Telegraph (United Kingdom) and sank in the North Sea 16 nautical miles (30 km) off Cromer, Norfolk with the loss of one of her crew . Survivors were rescued by Telegraph. Robert Burrell was on a voyage from London to Middlesbrough, Yorkshire.

== 3 December ==
List of shipwrecks: 3 December 1855
Ship	State	Description
Alpheus	Sweden	The schooner was wrecked on the Sud Koster with the loss of all but one of her crew. She was on a voyage from an English port to Strömstad.
British Dominion	United Kingdom	The tug ran aground on Taylor's Bank, in Liverpool Bay. She was refloated but was driven ashore and sank at Crosby, Lancashire. Her crew were rescued.
Florentia	United Kingdom	The barque was abandoned in the Atlantic Ocean. Her crew were rescued by Canvas and Gentoo (both United Kingdom). Florentia was on a voyage from Dalhousie, New Brunswick to London.
Flying Fish	(United Kingdom of Great Britain and Ireland) Jersey	The schooner was run down and sunk. She was on a voyage from São Miguel Island, Azores to Hull.
Oscar	United Kingdom	The brigantine was wrecked 60 nautical miles (110 km) south west of Landsort, Sweden. Her crew were rescued.

== 4 December ==
List of shipwrecks: 4 December 1855
Ship	State	Description
Afinia Hedegina	Netherlands	The ship ran aground near Helsingborg, Sweden. She was on a voyage from Newcastle upon Tyne, Northumberland, United Kingdom to "Carlshaven". She was refloated and taken in to Helsingborg for repairs.
Cape Cod	United States	The ship was abandoned in the Indian Ocean. Her crew were rescued by Rubens (France). Cape Cod was on a voyage from Calcutta, India to Boston, Massachusetts.
Copia	United Kingdom	The barque was driven ashore in the Sound of Sanda. She was refloated wit assistance from the steamship Dunaskin.
Nautilus	United States	The ship was abandopned in the Atlantic Ocean. Her crew were rescued. She was on a voyage from Smyrna, Ottoman Empire to Boston, Massachusetts.

== 5 December ==
List of shipwrecks: 5 December 1855
Ship	State	Description
Constitution	United States	The ship was destroyed by fire and sank in the River Mersey off Rock Ferry, Cheshire, United Kingdom. She was refloated on 12 December and beached. Constitution was towed in to Liverpool, Lancashire, United Kingdom on 6 March 1856 in a capsized condition.
Defiance	United Kingdom	The ship was driven ashore at Old Grimsby, Isles of Scilly. She was refloated and found to be leaky.
Erndte	Duchy of Holstein	The ship was driven ashore and damaged in the Eider.
Gustav Willem	Duchy of Holstein	The ship was driven ashore in the Eider.
Joseph Earle	United Kingdom	The ship ran aground in the Hoflands Waldero. She was on a voyage from Hartlepool, County Durham to Danzig.

== 6 December ==
List of shipwrecks: 6 December 1855
Ship	State	Description
Argo	Netherlands	The full-rigged ship was driven ashore at Beddingestrand, Sweden. She was on a voyage from Memel, Prussia to an English port.
Bueno Rachele	Flag unknown	The ship was driven ashore at Renkioi, Ottoman Empire.
Concord	United Kingdom	The smack was wrecked on the Longsand, in the North Sea off the coast of Essex whilst going to the assistance of Emerald (United Kingdom). All five people on board were rescued the next day by the smacks Lord Howe and Triune (both United Kingdom).
Dorothy	United Kingdom	The brig was driven ashore and wrecked at Dunkirk, Nord, France. Her ten crew were rescued. She was on a voyage from Santander, Spain to Dunkirk.
Diana	United Kingdom	The barque was driven ashore at Dunkirk. All on board were rescued. She was on a voyage from Havre de Grâce, Seine-Inférieure, France to Hartlepool, County Durham.
Emerald	United Kingdom	The brig was wrecked on the Longsand with the loss of two of her five crew. Survivors were rescued by the smacks Lord Howe and Triune (both United Kingdom).
Joseph Earle	United Kingdom	The barque was driven ashore at Helsingborg, Sweden. She was on a voyage from Hartlepool to Danzig.
Marco Polo	United Kingdom	While leaving the River Mersey in early December, the three-masted clipper parted her tow rope, collided with the barque Glasgow (United Kingdom), and ran aground. She was refloated and repaired in time for her to depart the next day for Melbourne, Victoria.
Marie	Kingdom of Hanover	The schooner was wrecked at "Lerhamn", Sweden. Her crew were rescued. She was on a voyage from Königsberg, Prussia to Sunderland, County Durham.
Rebecca Shout	United Kingdom	The ship foundered in the Mediterranean Sea between Cape Carbonara, Sardinia and Cap Ferrat, Alpes-Maritimes, France. Her crew survived. She was on a voyage from Agrigento, Sicily to the Clyde.

== 7 December ==
List of shipwrecks: 7 December 1855
Ship	State	Description
Fanny	United Kingdom	The ship was driven ashore near Wells-next-the-Sea, Norfolk. She was refloated on 11 December and taken in to Burnham Overy Staithe, Norfolk.
Margaret	United Kingdom	The schooner was wrecked near Onsala, Sweden. Her crew were rescued. She was on a voyage from Stettin to Leith, Lothian.
Mogador	France	The ship was driven ashore at Dunkirk, Nord. She was on a voyage from Akyab, Burma to Dunkirk. She was refloated.

== 8 December ==
List of shipwrecks: 8 December 1855
Ship	State	Description
Helene	Bremen	The ship foundered in the North Sea off Heligoland. Her crew were rescued. She was on a voyage from an English port to Hamburg.
James	United Kingdom	The ship was driven ashore in the Scheldt. She was on a voyage from Antwerp, Belgium to Newcastle upon Tyne, Northumberland.
John Scott	United Kingdom	The ship departed from Demerara, British Guiana for London. No further trace, presumed foundered with the loss of all hands.
Juan Fernandez	Flag unknown	The ship was driven ashore at Calcutta, India. She was on a voyage from Calcutta to London.
Oporto	United Kingdom	The brig struck the Lage d'Arve Rock and was damaged. She was on a voyage from Glasgow, Renfrewshire to Porto, Portugal.

== 9 December ==
List of shipwrecks: 9 December 1855
Ship	State	Description
Garland	United Kingdom	The ship ran aground on the Glasgowman Bank, in the Irish Sea off the coast of County Dublin. She was on a voyage from Liverpool, Lancashire to Jamaica. She was refloated on 11 December and put in to Waterford.
Hannah	United Kingdom	The schooner was holed by her anchor and sank in Angle Bay. She was on a voyage from Woolwich, Kent to Dublin. She was later refloated, repaired and resumed her voyage.

== 10 December ==
List of shipwrecks: 10 December 1855
Ship	State	Description
Belle	United Kingdom	The ship ran aground off Peel Point, Cornwall and was damaged. She was beached in Whitsand Bay.
Bravo	Spain	The brig was driven ashore and wrecked near Gibraltar with the loss of 22 of the 45 people on board. She was on a voyage from Barcelona to Havana, Cuba and/or Buenos Aires, Argentina.
Decente	Sweden	The ship was destroyed by fire in the Sea of Marmora. Her crew were rescued.
Georgina	United States	The full-rigged ship was driven ashore at Gibraltar with the loss of a crew member. She was on a voyage from Valencia, Spain to Virginia. Georgina was refloated on 22 August 1856 and taken in to Gibraltar.
Grasmere	United Kingdom	The ship ran aground in Bootle Bay. She was on a voyage from Caldera, Chile to Liverpool, Lancashire. She was refloated and taken in to the River Mersey.
Liebnitz	Flag unknown	The ship was driven ashore and sank at Barber's Point, in the Dardanelles.
Verona	United Kingdom	The ship foundered off Réunion. She was on a voyage from Mauritius to Melbourne, Victoria.
Enterprise	United Kingdom	The ship was driven ashore by a snowstorm in Georgian Bay. She was on a voyage from Owen Sound to Collingwood Harbor, Upper Canada.

== 11 December ==
List of shipwrecks: 11 December 1855
Ship	State	Description
Bombay	United Kingdom	The brig was driven ashore at the mouth of the Guadiana with the loss of a crew member.
Bravo	Spain	The brig was driven ashore and wrecked at the Torre Carbonera with the loss of 22 of the 45 people on board. She was on a voyage from Barcelona to Havana, Cuba.
Diana	Duchy of Holstein	The schooner ran aground on the Abbo Reef. She was on a voyage from Flensburg to Leith, Lothian, United Kingdom. She was refloated and taken in to Nyborg, Denmark in a leaky condition.
Lee	United Kingdom	The ship ran aground on the Herd Sand, in the North Sea off the coast of County Durham. She was on a voyage from Aberdeen to Sunderland, County Durham. She was refloated and taken in to South Shields, County Durham.
Osprey	United Kingdom	The ship was run into by Albatross (United Kingdom) and sank in the Bristol Channel. Her crew were rescued. She was on a voyage from Cardiff, Glamorgan to London.
Stirlingshire	United Kingdom	The full-rigged ship was driven ashore at Swansea, Glamorgan. She was on a voyage from Quebec City, Province of Canada, British North America to Swansea.
Susan King	United Kingdom	The ship ran aground on the Barber Sand, in the North Sea off the coast of Norfolk. She was on a voyage from London to Sunderland. She was refloated and taken in to Great Yarmouth, Norfolk in a leaky condition.

== 12 December ==
List of shipwrecks: 12 December 1855
Ship	State	Description
Janet	United Kingdom	The brig was driven ashore at Great Yarmouth. She was on a voyage from London to Newcastle upon Tyne, Northumberland.
Moodkee	United Kingdom	The ship ran aground on the Goodwin Sands, Kent. She was on a voyage from Newcastle upon Tyne to Malta. She was refloated.
Prince Albert	United Kingdom	The ship ran aground on the Cockle Sand, in the North Sea off the coast of Norfolk. She was on a voyage from Hull, Yorkshire to London. She was refloated but was consequently beached at Great Yarmouth, Norfolk.
Ville de Liège	Belgium	The schooner was driven ashore at Gibraltar. She was on a voyage from Antwerp to Marseille, Bouches-du-Rhône, Francs. She was refloated with the aid of the tug Bustler (Royal Navy).

== 13 December ==
List of shipwrecks: 13 December 1855
Ship	State	Description
Catherine	United Kingdom	The ship was driven ashore 15 to 20 nautical miles (28 to 37 km) south of Valencia, Spain. Her crew were rescued. She was on a voyage from Marseille, Bouches-du-Rhône, France to Liverpool, Lancashire.
Eliza	Netherlands	The brig ran aground on the Sunk Sand, in the North Sea off the coast of Essex, United Kingdom and was abandoned by her crew. She was refloated with the assistance of the smacks Aurora's Increase and Marco Polo and a lugger (all United Kingdom).
Fanny Palmer	United Kingdom	The schooner foundered in the Mediterranean Sea 30 nautical miles (56 km) south of Marittima, Kingdom of the Two Sicilies. Her crew survived. She was on a voyage from Patras, Greece to London.
Haidee	United Kingdom	The ship was wrecked on a reef off Mocha Island, Chile with the loss of two lives. She was on a voyage from Liverpool, Lancashire to Montevideo, Uruguay and San Francisco, California, United States.
Janette	United Kingdom	The ship caught fire in the Atlantic Ocean and was abandoned. Her crew were rescued by Jessamine (United Kingdom). Janette was on a voyage from Mogador, Morocco to London.
William Rennie	United Kingdom	The barque foundered in the Atlantic Ocean. Her crew were rescued by Stirlingshire (United Kingdom). William Rennie was on a voyage from Syros, Greece to Falmouth, Cornwall or Queenstown, County Cork.

== 14 December ==
List of shipwrecks: 14 December 1855
Ship	State	Description
Barrackpore	France	The transport ship was wrecked on Marmara Island, Ottoman Empire. Her crew survived. They were rescued on 21 December by HMS Oberon (Royal Navy).
Elizabeth	United Kingdom	The schooner was driven ashore and wrecked at Aberffraw, Anglesey. Her crew were rescued. She was refloated on 18 December nd taken on to Holyhead, Anglesy.
Georgiana	United Kingdom	The ship was driven ashore at the Torre Carbonera, Spain. She was on a voyage from Valencia, Spain to Liverpool, Lancashire.
Josephine	United Kingdom	The brig was driven ashore in Hoy Sound. she was on a voyage from Quebec City, Province of Canada, British North America to Aberdeen.
Mermaid	United Kingdom	The ship sprang a leak and sank in the Atlantic Ocean. Her crew were rescued by Karnack (United Kingdom). Mermaid was on a voyage from Seville, Spain to London.
Superb	United Kingdom	The barque was wrecked in Mocatta Bay, in the Black Sea with the loss of fourteen of her fifteen crew.

== 15 December ==
List of shipwrecks: 15 December 1855
Ship	State	Description
Deben	United Kingdom	The schooner was sighted off Bridlington, Yorkshire whilst on a voyage from Wisbech, Cambridgeshire to Grangemouth, Stirlingshire. No further trace, presumed foundered with the loss of all hands.
Margaret	United Kingdom	The ship departed from Queenstown, County Cork for London. No further trace, presumed foundered with the loss of all hands.
Renfrewshire	United Kingdom	The ship struck the South Rock, in Belfast Lough and was damaged. She was on a voyage from Quebec City, Province of Canada, British North America to the Clyde. She was refloated and completed her voyage.
Victoria	United Kingdom	The schooner was wrecked between "Karingon" and Gullholmen, Norway. She was on a voyage from Hull, Yorkshire to Malmö, Sweden.

== 16 December ==
List of shipwrecks: 16 December 1855
Ship	State	Description
Robert	Hamburg	The ship was driven ashore and wrecked near Hirtshals, Denmark. She was on a voyage from the Firth of Forth to Aarhus, Denmark.
Robert Thomas	United Kingdom	The ship was driven ashore on the Isla delli Corrienti, off Cape Passero, Sicily. She was on a voyage from Trieste to Queenstown, County Cork.
Vanskapen	Sweden	The ship was wrecked on Skagen, Denmark. She was on a voyage from Newcastle upon Tyne, Northumberland, United Kingdom to Malmö.

== 17 December ==
List of shipwrecks: 17 December 1855
Ship	State	Description
City of Washington	United Kingdom	The steamship ran aground at Marseille, Bouches-du-Rhône, France and was damaged. She was on a voyage from Liverpool, Lancashire to Marseille.
Corinna	United Kingdom	The ship ran aground on Scroby Sands, Norfolk. She was on a voyage from Newcastle upon Tyne, Northumberland to Constantinople, Ottoman Empire. She had been refloated by 19 December and taken in to Great Yarmouth, Norfolk.
Good Intent	United Kingdom	The fishing smack was run down and sunk in the English Channel off Start Point, Devon by Napoleon III (France) with the loss of a crew member. Survivors were rescued by Napoleon III.
John	United Kingdom	The ship was wrecked on the Arklow Bank, in the Irish Sea off the coast of County Wicklow. Her crew survived.
Koh-i-Noor	United Kingdom	The ship was driven ashore at Tranmere, Cheshire. She was refloated on 19 December.
Mariner	United Kingdom	The ship was lost at Brest, Finistère, France. Her crew were rescued.
Maria	Prussia	The ship was driven ashore and wrecked at Brielle, South Holland, Netherlands.
Mark	United Kingdom	The schooner was driven ashore at Monk's Ferry, Birkenhead, Cheshire. She was on a voyage from Garston to Liverpool, Lancashire. She was refloated on 19 December.
Vision	United Kingdom	The ship ran aground on the Nantucket Shoals, in the Atlantic Ocean off the coast of Massachusetts, United States. She was on a voyage from Aberdeen to New York, United States. She was refloated and completed her voyage.

== 18 December ==
List of shipwrecks: 18 December 1855
Ship	State	Description
Amulet	United Kingdom	The brig struck the Sparrow Hawk and was then driven ashore at South Shields, County Durham. Her crew were rescued by rocket apparatus. She was on a voyage from London to South Shields.
Ann	United Kingdom	The schooner was driven ashore at Great Yarmouth, Norfolk. She was on a voyage from Teignmouth, Devon to Aberdeen.She was refloated on 26 December and taken in to Great Yarmouth in a severely damaged condition.
Ant	United Kingdom	The schooner was sighted off Coquet Island, Northumberland whilst on a voyage from London to Leith, Lothian. No further trace, presumed foundered with the loss of all hands.
Betsey	United Kingdom	The brig ran aground on the Blacktail Sand, in the Thames Estuary and was wrecked. Her crew were rescued. She was on a voyage from Hartlepool, County Durham to London.
Christiania	United Kingdom	The ship was driven ashore at Harwich, Essex. She was on a voyage from London to Newcastle upon Tyne, Northumberland.
Eliza	United Kingdom	The brig was driven ashore and wrecked at Gorleston, Suffolk. Her eight crew were rescued by the lifeboat Rescuer (United Kingdom).
Exe	United Kingdom	The brig was driven ashore at Great Yarmouth. Her crew were rescued.
Fortitude	United Kingdom	The ship was driven ashore at Gorleston. Her crew were rescued.
George, and Pensher	United Kingdom	The schooner George and the brig Pensher collided in the North Sea off the coast of Norfolk. The crew of George got aboard Pensher, but two of them reboarded George. Pensher drove ashore at Great Yarmouth. George drove ashore there the next day; she was on a voyage from Great Yarmouth to Newcastle upon Tyne.
Hebe	United Kingdom	The ship was driven ashore at Lowestoft, Suffolk. Her crew were rescued.
Hibernia	United Kingdom	The ship was wrecked north of Staithes, Yorkshire. She was on a voyage from Sunderland, County Durham to London.
Isabella	United Kingdom	The brigantine struck the St. Patrick's Bridge Rock, in the Saltee Islands, County Donegal. She was then driven ashore and wrecked at Kilmore, County Wexford with the loss of one of her seven crew. She was on a voyage from Newport, Monmouthshire to Waterford.
James Watt	United Kingdom	The ship was driven ashore near "Colmar". She was on a voyage from Hartlepool, County Durham to Hamburg.
Jane and Catherine	United Kingdom	The ship ran aground and was wrecked at Kirkcaldy, Fife. She was on a voyage from Seville, Spain to Kirkcaldy. She floated off on 26 December.
Johns	United Kingdom	The ship was driven ashore north of Ramsey, Isle of Man. She was on a voyage from Liverpool, Lancashire to Stranraer, Wigtownshire.
Josephine	United Kingdom	The ship was driven ashore on the Skerries of Clanstrau, Orkney Islands. She was on a voyage from Quebec City, Province of Canada, British North America to Aberdeen.
Juventus, and Orb	United Kingdom	The brigs were in collision in the North Sea. Juventus was beached at Great Yarmouth. Orb was beached at Gorleston.
Laura	United Kingdom	The ship ran aground on the West Hoyle, in Liverpool Bay. She was on a voyage from Liverpool, Lancashire to Pernambuco, Brazil. She was refloated and put back to Liverpool in a leaky condition.
Lelean	United Kingdom	The schooner was wrecked on the Goodwin Sands, Kent. Her crew were rescued by the Ramsgate Lifeboat. She was on a voyage from Rotterdam, South Holland, Netherlands to Liverpool.
Margaret and Ellen	United Kingdom	The smack was wrecked at Point Lynas, Anglesey. Her crew survived. She was on a voyage from Liverpool to Amlwch, Anglesey.
Mary	United Kingdom	The sloop was driven ashore and wrecked at Great Yarmouth. Her crew were rescued.
Pauline	Rostock	The ship was wrecked near Dahme, Duchy of Schleswig. Her crew were rescued. She was on a voyage from an English port to Rostock.
Philippa	United Kingdom	The schooner was driven ashore and wrecked at Milton, Dunbartonshire with the loss of a crew member. She was on a voyage from Workington, Cumberland to Belfast County Antrim.
Providence	United Kingdom	The ship was driven ashore at Lowestoft. Her crew were rescued. She was on a voyage from Maldon, Essex to Port Dundas, Renfrewshire.
Redwing	United Kingdom	The brig ran aground on the Black Middens, in the North Sea off the coast of County Durham. She was refloated on 22 December.
Rickleef	Duchy of Holstein	The ship was driven ashore by ice and wrecked near "Leknskov", Denmark.
Venelia	United Kingdom	The schooner was driven ashore at Kessingland, Suffolk. She was refloated on 25 December and taken in to Lowestoft.
Yacht	United Kingdom	The ship was driven ashore and severely damaged at Sunderland. She was on a voyage from Honfleur, Calvados to Seaham, County Durham.

== 19 December ==
List of shipwrecks: 19 December 1855
Ship	State	Description
Benton	United Kingdom	The ship was driven ashore at Clee Ness, Lincolnshire. She was on a voyage from Newcastle upon Tyne, Northumberland to London. She was refloated and taken in to Grimsby, Lincolnshire in a severely leaky condition.
Boa	United Kingdom	The ship was driven ashore at Great Yarmouth, Norfolk.
Caledonia	United Kingdom	The ship was driven ashore and wrecked at Sevastopol, Russia with the loss of all hands.
Colley	United Kingdom	The ship was driven ashore and severely damaged at Sunderland, County Durham.
Comet	United Kingdom	The ship was driven ashore and wrecked at South Shields, County Durham.
Courier	United Kingdom	The sloop was driven ashore and wrecked at Gorleston, Suffolk. She was on a voyage from London to Sunderland. She was refloated on 26 December.
Cortes	United States	The transport ship was driven ashore at Sevastopol. Her crew were rescued.
Edward and Sarah	United Kingdom	The brig was driven ashore and wrecked at Sunderland. Her crew were rescued. She was on a voyage from London to Sunderland.
Eliza	United Kingdom	The ship was driven ashore and wrecked at Great Yarmouth.
Elizabeth	United Kingdom	The ship was driven ashore and scuttled at Balbriggan, County Dublin. She was refloated on 25 December.
Ellen	United Kingdom	The schooner was driven ashore at Dundee, Forfarshire with the loss of a crew member. She was on a voyage from Wisbech, Cambridgeshire to Dundee.
Emma	United Kingdom	The ship was driven ashore at Lowestoft, Suffolk. Her crew were rescued. She was on a voyage from Exeter, Devon to Hartlepool, county Durham. She was refloated on 20 December.
Exchange	United Kingdom	The ship was driven ashore and severely damaged at Sunderland.
Friends	United Kingdom	The ship was driven ashore at Great Yarmouth.
George	United Kingdom	The ship was in collision with Plusher (United Kingdom) and was beached at Great Yarmouth.
George and Margaret	United Kingdom	The ship was driven ashore at Lowestoft. Her crew were rescued.
Isabella	United Kingdom	The ship was driven ashore and wrecked at Kilmore, County Wexford with the loss of a crew member. She was on a voyage from Newport, Monmouthshire to Waterford.
Jennet	United Kingdom	The ship was driven ashore at Great Yarmouth.
John	United Kingdom	The sloop was driven ashore at Seaton Carew, County Durham. She was refloated on 21 December and towed in to Hartlepool, County Durham. Subsequently towed to Middlesbrough, Yorkshire for repairs.
Julet	United Kingdom	The ship was driven ashore at South Shields.
Lady Arabella	United Kingdom	The sloop was wrecked at Douglas Head, Isle of Man with the loss of all hands. She was on a voyage from Glasgow, Renfrewshire to Runcorn, Cheshire.
Lelean	United Kingdom	The schooner ran aground on the Goodwin Sands, Kent. Her crew reached the Gull Lightship, ( Trinity House) from where they were rescued by the lifeboat Northumberland (United Kingdom).
Lovely Nelly	United Kingdom	The ship was driven ashore and severely damaged at Sunderland.
Mars	United Kingdom	The steamship ran aground on the Dromore Bank, in the Irish Sea.
Mead	United Kingdom	The ship was driven ashore and wrecked at Seaton, County Durham. Her crew were rescued. She was on a voyage from London to Hartlepool, County Durham.
North Britain	United Kingdom	The ship was driven ashore and wrecked at St Cyrus, Aberdeenshire with the loss of all hands.
Oak	United Kingdom	The ship was driven ashore at Great Yarmouth.
Otter	United Kingdom	The smack was driven ashore on Sanday, Orkney Islands. She had been refloated by 27 December.
Philip	United Kingdom	The brig was driven ashore and wrecked at the mouth of the River Dee with the loss of one of her six crew.
Prosperous	United Kingdom	The ship ran aground on the Trinity Sand, in the North Sea off the coast of Lincolnshire. She was on a voyage from Rochester, Kent to Sunderland.
Redwing	United Kingdom	The ship was driven ashore at South Shields.
Robert Boyle	United Kingdom	The sloop was driven ashore in the Bay of Luce.
Sarah Ann	United Kingdom	The sloop was driven ashore at Great Yarmouth. She was on a voyage from Lowestoft to Hull, Yorkshire. She was refloated on 26 December and towed in to Great Yarmouth.
Soken	United Kingdom	The ship was driven ashore at Lowestoft. Her crew were rescued. She was on a voyage from London to Sunderland. She subsequently became a wreck.
Sorciere	(United Kingdom of Great Britain and Ireland) Guernsey	The ship was wrecked on the Doger Bank, in the Irish Sea. She was on a voyage from Liverpool to São Miguel Island, Azores.
Stantons	United Kingdom	The brig was driven ashore at Great Yarmouth. Her crew were rescued. She was on a voyage from Exeter, Devon to Hartlepool.
Talavera	United Kingdom	The transport ship was wrecked on Marmara Island, Ottoman Empire. Her crew were rescued on 21 December by HMS Oberon (Royal Navy)
Thistle	United Kingdom	The brig was driven ashore at Passage East, County Waterford.
Unity	United Kingdom	The ship was driven ashore and wrecked at Great Yarmouth.
Ward Jackson	United Kingdom	The ship was driven ashore at "Colmar". She was refloated on 1 January 1856 with assistance of the steamship Superb (United Kingdom) and taken in to Glückstadt, Prussia.
William and Sarah Ann	United Kingdom	The ship collided with James (United Kingdom) and sank off Great Yarmouth. Her crew were rescued. She was on a voyage from London to Wakefield, Yorkshire.

== 20 December ==
List of shipwrecks: 20 December 1855
Ship	State	Description
Bernardine	United Kingdom	The ship was wrecked at Sulina, Ottoman Empire. Her crew were rescued. She was on a voyage from Galaţi, Ottoman Empire to an English port.
Brothers	United Kingdom	The ship caught fire and was scuttled at Holyhead, Anglesey. She was refloated on 25 December and placed under repair.
Brothers	United Kingdom	The smack was driven ashore and wrecked on Sanday, Orkney Islands.
Catherine	United Kingdom	The schooner was driven ashore and wrecked at Fowey, Cornwall. She was on a voyage from Dunkirk, Nord to Fowey.
Independente	Spain	The disabled paddle steamer was driven ashore and wrecked at Black Head, 5 nautical miles (9.3 km) east of Exmouth, Devon, United Kingdom. Her 25 crew were rescued. She was on a voyage from Cádiz to London, United Kingdom.
John Bull	United Kingdom	The schooner was driven ashore at Dungarvan, County Waterford. She was on a voyage from Newport, Monmouthshire to Youghal, County Cork.
John Webb	United Kingdom	The schooner was driven ashore and wrecked at Dungarvan.
London	United Kingdom	The schooner was abandoned in the North Sea off the Farne Islands, Northumberland. Her three crew took to a boat. Two survivors were rescued on 22 December by Temperance Star (United Kingdom). London was on a voyage from Boston, Lincolnshire to Port Dundas, Renfrewshire. She came ashore and was wrecked at Berwick upon Tweed, Northumberland.
Nantes	France	The schooner was wrecked on the coast of Pembrokeshire, United Kingdom. Her crew were rescued by the Coast Guard.
Nord America	Hamburg	The ship ran aground on the Elbow Sand, in the North Sea off the coast of Kent, United Kingdom and was damaged. She was on a voyage from New York, United States to Hamburg.
Star	United Kingdom	The schooner was discovered derelict in the Irish Sea. She was on a voyage from Portrush, County Antrim to Liverpool, Lancashire. She was taken in to Portrush.

== 21 December ==
List of shipwrecks: 21 December 1855
Ship	State	Description
Albion	United Kingdom	The schooner was driven ashore and damaged at Milford Haven, Pembrokeshire. She was on a voyage from Plymouth, Devon to a port in County Meath. She was refloated.
Colin	United Kingdom	The ship was driven ashore and severely damaged at Balbriggan, County Dublin, She was on a voyage from Quebec City, Province of Canada, British North America to Gloucester.
Elizabeth and William	United Kingdom	The ship was driven ashore and severely damaged at Balbriggan.
John Wesley	United Kingdom	The ship was driven ashore at Youghal, County Cork. She was on a voyage from Callao, Peru to London. She was refloated on 12 January 1856 and taken in to Youghal for repairs.
Maria	United Kingdom	The ship was wrecked at Memel, Prussia.
Marietta	Spain	The brig put in to Kinsale, County Cork in a sinking condition. She was on a voyage from Seville to London.
Phœbe	United Kingdom	The ship was in collision with Prosperity (United Kingdom) and was run ashore at Newby East, Cumberland.
Samuel Burnett	United Kingdom	The ship was driven ashore at Redcar, Yorkshire. She was on a voyage from Dunkirk, Nord, France to Middlesbrough, Yorkshire. She was refloated and taken in to the River Tees.
Young Rose	United Kingdom	The ship was driven ashore at Dale, Pembrokeshire. She was on a voyage from Nantes, Loire-Inférieure, France to Llanelly, Glamorgan.

== 22 December ==
List of shipwrecks: 22 December 1855
Ship	State	Description
Alejandra	Spain	The brig was driven ashore on the Île de Batz, Finistère, France. She had been refloated by 26 December with assistance from the steamship Burlington (United Kingdom).
Bon Accord	United Kingdom	The barque was wrecked in the Saltee Islands, County Wexford. Her crew were rescued. She was on a voyage from Penang, Malaya to Liverpool, Lancashire.
Catherine	United Kingdom	The ship was driven ashore at Balbriggan, County Dublin. She was refloated on 8 January 1856.
Cordelia	United Kingdom	The schooner was abandoned off the coast of Cornwall. She was wrecked the next day on the Praa Sands. She was on a voyage from Portsmouth, Hampshire to Newport, Monmouthshire.
Eliza	United Kingdom	The ship struck a sunken rock in the River Carrowbeg and was beached. She was on a voyage from Sligo to Runcorn, Cheshire.
Favourite	United Kingdom	The ship was driven ashore in Musselwich Bay. She was on a voyage from Southwold, Suffolk to Milford Haven, Pembrokeshire.
Jenny	United Kingdom	The ship was driven ashore and wrecked on Walney Island, Lancashire. Her crew were rescued. She was on a voyage from Barrow-in-Furness to Garston, Lancashire.
John Black	United Kingdom	The ship was stranded on the Swedish coast between Viken and Hararas (Höganäs?). She was on a voyage from Memel, Prussia to a Scottish port.
Lauriston	United Kingdom	The brig was driven ashore at Rosetta, Egypt.
Lochindal	United Kingdom	The ship was driven ashore at Findhorn, Moray. She was refloated the next day.
Prometheus	United Kingdom	The schooner was driven ashore on the Praa Sands. Her crew were rescued.
Temis	Spain	The brigantine was wrecked at Punta de Mulas, Cuba. She was on a voyage from Liverpool to Havana, Cuba.
Union	United Kingdom	The schooner was driven ashore and wrecked at Griceness, Stronsay, Orkney Islands. Her crew were rescued. She was on a voyage from London to Portsoy, Aberdeenshire.
Washington	United States	The paddle steamer ran aground on the Long Sand, in the North Sea off the coast of Essex, United Kingdom. She was on a voyage from Bremen to Southampton, Hampshire, United Kingdom. She was refloated and resumed her voyage.
Waterwitch	United Kingdom	The ship was driven ashore and severely damaged on Mousa, Shetland Islands. Her crew were rescued. She was refloated on 6 January 1856.
Will Watch	United Kingdom	The schooner was wrecked on the Elbow End Bank, off the mouth of the River Tay. She was on a voyage from King's Lynn, Norfolk to Grangemouth, Stirlingshire.

== 23 December ==
List of shipwrecks: 23 December 1855
Ship	State	Description
Agenoria	United Kingdom	The ship was wrecked on St. Catherine's Rocks. Three crew were rescued by the RNLI Tenby lifeboat. She was on a voyage from Cardiff, Glamorgan to Bideford, Devon.
Alexandre	France	The schooner was wrecked on St. Catherine's Rocks. Her five crew were rescued by the RNLI Tenby lifeboat. She was on a voyage from Cardiff to Nantes, Loire-Inférieure.
Eliza Lower	United Kingdom	The brig was driven ashore and wrecked at Rye, Sussex. Her six crew were rescued by the tug Erin (United Kingdom). Eliza Lower was on a voyage from Sunderland, County Durham to Le Tréport, Seine-Inférieure, France.
Faith	Ottoman Empire	The steamship foundered in the English Channel off the Owers Lightship ( Trinity House) with the loss of a crew member. Twenty-nine survivors were rescued by the brig Elizabeth and Ann (United Kingdom) was on a voyage from London, United Kingdom to Constantinople.
Gleaner	United Kingdom	The brig was wrecked in the River Tay. Her ten crew were rescued by the Dundee Lifeboat. She was on a voyage from Saint John, New Brunswick, British North America to Dundee, Forfarshire.
Hero	United Kingdom	The schooner was driven ashore and wrecked at North Sunderland, County Durham. Her crew were rescued. She was on a voyage from Seaham, County Durham to Aberdeen.
Jane Ann	United Kingdom	The ship was driven ashore and damaged at Westport, County Mayo. She was on a voyage from Limerick to the Clyde.
Lloyds	United Kingdom	The sloop was driven ashore and wrecked at Ackergill Castle, Caithness. Her crew were rescued. She was on a voyage from Culloden, Inverness-shire to Wick, Caithness.
London	United Kingdom	The paddle steamer was driven against the pier and severely damaged at Newhaven, Sussex. She was on a voyage from Dieppe Seine-Inférieure, France to Newhaven.
Mary	United Kingdom	The ship was driven ashore at Ardlamont Point Argyllshire. She was on a voyage from the Clyde to Tobermory, Isle of Mull, Inner Hebrides.
North York	United Kingdom	The brig foundered in the North Sea 30 nautical miles (56 km) off Hartlepool, County Durham. Her nine crew took to a boat, and were rescued off the Firth of Forth on 25 December by the brig Uva (United Kingdom). North York was on a voyage from South Shields, County Durham to London.
Themis	United Kingdom	The transport ship caught fire off Yevpatoria, Russia. She sank the next day.

== 24 December ==
List of shipwrecks: 24 December 1855
Ship	State	Description
Amelia	United Kingdom	The smack was driven ashore near Moville, County Donegal. She was on a voyage from Londonderry to Dunfanaghy, County Donegal. She was refloated on 12 January 1856.
Arabat	United Kingdom	The brig ran aground on the Conigli Rock, off Tenedos, Ottoman Empire. She was on a voyage from Liverpool, Lancashire to Constantinople, Ottoman Empire. She was destroyed by fire on 31 December.
Arundell	United Kingdom	The ship was destroyed by fire in the Indian Ocean. Her crew were rescued by Wild Wave (United Kingdom). Arundell was on a voyage from Hull, Yorkshire to Bombay, India.
Betsey	United Kingdom	The Yorkshire Billyboy ran aground on the Plough Seat, off Lindisfarne, Northumberland. Her crew were rescued. She was on a voyage from Boston, Lincolnshire to Leith, Lothian. She later sank.
Charlotte	France	The brig was wrecked at Harlech, Merionethshire, United Kingdom with the loss of four of her nine crew. Her captain was rescued by the Portmadoc Lifeboat, the other survivors reached shore in the longboat. Charlotte was on a voyage from Havre de Grâce, Seine-Inférieure to Neath, Glamorgan, United Kingdom.
Christian Charlotte	United Kingdom	The ship was driven ashore and severely damaged on Colonsay, Orkney Islands. She was on a voyage from Liverpool, Lancashire to Newcastle upon Tyne, Northumberland.
Dagger	United Kingdom	The barque was driven ashore and wrecked at Veracruz, Mexico.
Defiance	United Kingdom	The ship was driven ashore and wrecked at Strand Point, Argyllshire. She was on a voyage from Glasgow, Renfrewshire to Rouen, Seine-Inférieure, france.
Edinburgh	United Kingdom	The ship was driven ashore at Newburgh, Fife.
Hazard	United Kingdom	The ship was driven ashore at Kilschosland, Argyllshire. She was on a voyage from Newry, County Antrim to the Clyde.
Hero	United Kingdom	The schooner was driven ashore and wrecked at North Sunderland, County Durham.
Hope	United Kingdom	The ship was driven ashore in Loch Indaal. She was on a voyage from Llanelly, Glamorgan to Londonderry.
Nautilus	United Kingdom	The ship sank at Málaga, Spain.
Norfolk	United Kingdom	The ship was driven ashore at "Mulroy". She was on a voyage from Sligo to Liverpool.
Ocean Queen	United Kingdom	The ship was driven ashore in Downing's Bay, County Donegal.
Philanthropist	United States	The fishing schooner was lost at mouth of the harbor of Annisquam, Massachusetts. Crew saved.
Speed	United Kingdom	The ship sprang a leak and was beached on the "North Head of Bridport". She was on a voyage from Halifax, Nova Scotia, British North America to Hull, Yorkshire. She had been refloated by 3 January 1856.
Swordfish	United Kingdom	The full-rigged ship was driven ashore and damaged at Kelfoot Point, County Antrim. She was on a voyage from Alexandria, Egypt to Liverpool. She was refloated and taken in to the Belfast Lough.

== 25 December ==
List of shipwrecks: 25 December 1855
Ship	State	Description
Duncan Ritchie	United Kingdom	The ship was driven ashore in Hermitage Bay.
John	United Kingdom	The ship was wrecked at Langton Matravers, Dorset with the loss of two lives. She was on a voyage from Jersey, Channel Islands to Teignmouth, Devon.
Lightning	(United Kingdom of Great Britain and Ireland) Guernsey	The ship was driven ashore at Lowestoft, Suffolk. She was refloated and taken in to Lowestoft.
Vigorous	United Kingdom	The Humber Keel was discovered derelict in the North Sea.

== 26 December ==
List of shipwrecks: 26 December 1855
Ship	State	Description
Eliza	United Kingdom	The ship was driven ashore at Withernsea, Yorkshire. She was refloated on 7 January 1856 and taken in to Hull, Yorkshire.
Eliza Hart	United Kingdom	The ship was driven ashore at Dungeness, Kent. She was refloated and taken in to Margate, Kent.
Fiel	Portugal	The ship was wrecked at Ventry, County Kerry, United Kingdom. She was on a voyage from Aveiro to Cork, United Kingdom.
Frigga	Denmark	The ship ran aground on the Kobbergrund and was wrecked. Her crew were rescued. She was on a voyage from Rio de Janeiro, Brazil to Copenhagen.

== 27 December ==
List of shipwrecks: 27 December 1855
Ship	State	Description
Governor Morton	United Kingdom	The ship ran aground on the Ridge Sand. She was on a voyage from Calcutta, India to London. She was refloated and taken in to The Downs in a leaky condition.
Schomberg	United Kingdom	The full-rigged ship Went aground on uncharted sandspit 35 miles west of Cape Otway, Victoria and became a wreck. All on board were rescued the next day by the steamship Queen ( (United Kingdom of Great Britain and Ireland) Victoria). Schomberg was on her maiden voyage, from Liverpool, Lancashire to Melbourne, Victoria.
Virginia	United States	The ship was wrecked on the Ringwarner Reef. She was on a voyage from British Honduras to a British port.

== 28 December ==
List of shipwrecks: 28 December 1855
Ship	State	Description
Jane	United Kingdom	The schooner was run into by the brig Solide (Sweden) and was abandoned off Fuengirola, Spain with by five of her seven crew. They were rescued by Solide. The remaining two crew abandoned her the next day and she subsequently foundered. Jane was on a voyage from Maryport, Cumberland to Marseille, Bouches-du-Rhône, France.
Medina Guthrie	Spain	The ship was wrecked at the mouth of the Magdalena River with the loss of a crew member. She was on a voyage from Santa Martha, Republic of New Granada to Cartagena.
Rob Roy	United Kingdom	The steamship ran aground off the Île de Batz, Finistère, France. She was refloated the next day.

== 29 December ==
List of shipwrecks: 29 December 1855
Ship	State	Description
Elizabeth	United Kingdom	The ship foundered in the Atlantic Ocean. All ten crew presumed lost. A message in a bottle detailing the ship's fate washed up at Ballycotton, County Cork on 9 January 1856.
Jessy Hamilton	United Kingdom	The ship was driven ashore at Westport, County Mayo. Her crew were rescued. She floated off and drove out to sea.
Nacional	Belgium	The barque caught fire at Rio de Janeiro, Brazil and was scuttled.
Ohio	United Kingdom	The ship was wrecked on the south coast of the Ross of Mull, Mull, Inner Hebrides with the loss of a crew member.
Velocity	United Kingdom	The brig was wrecked on the Minor Reef, off Exuma, Bahamas. Her crew were rescued. She was on a voyage from Antigua to Exuma.

== 30 December ==
List of shipwrecks: 30 December 1855
Ship	State	Description
Thornley	United Kingdom	The ship ran aground on the Holm Sand, in the North Sea off the coast of Suffolk. She was on a voyage from Sunderland, County Durham to London. She was refloated.
Ocean Belle	United Kingdom	The ship departed from Halifax, Nova Scotia, British North America for Liverpool, Lancashire. No further trace, presumed foundered with the loss of all hands.
Wanderer	United Kingdom	The schooner was discovered abandoned off the Isle of Skye.

== 31 December ==
List of shipwrecks: 31 December 1855
Ship	State	Description
Emblem	United Kingdom	The schooner was in collision with another vessel and foundered in the North Sea off the coast of Fife with the loss of all five crew. She was on a voyage from Wisbech, Cambridgeshire to Grangemouth, Stirlingshire.
Four Sisters	United Kingdom	The brig was driven ashore at Shoreham-by-Sea, Sussex. She was refloated and towed in to Shoreham-by-Sea.
Leah	United States	The full-rigged ship departed from New York for Antwerp, Belgium. No further trace, presumed foundered with the loss of all hands.
Robert Carnley	United States	The ship departed from New York for Antwerp. No further trace, presumed foundered with the loss of all hands.
William and Jane	United Kingdom	The brig ran aground on the Stoney Binks, in the North Sea off the mouth of the Humber. She was refloated and towed in to Hull, Yorkshire in a severely leaky condition.

== Unknown date ==
List of shipwrecks: Unknown date in December 1855
Ship	State	Description
Adams	United Kingdom	The ship foundered in the Mozambique Channel with the subsequent loss of thirteen of her crew. She was on a voyage from Bombay, India to London.
Albion	United Kingdom	The sloop departed from the Orkney Islands for Crail, Fife in mid-December. No further trace, presumed foundered with the loss of all hands.
Alice Walker	United Kingdom	The barque was wrecked between İğneada and "Media", Ottoman Empire before 31 December. All on board were rescued.
Ashburton	United Kingdom	The ship ran aground off the American coast before 25 December. She was on a voyage from New Orleans, Louisiana, United States to Liverpool, Lancashire. She had been refloated by 28 December and resumed her voyage.
Bernard	Kingdom of Hanover	The schooner was wrecked at Sulina, Ottoman Empire between 18 and 20 December. Her crew were rescued.
Columbine	United Kingdom	The steamship was driven ashore on the Dutch coast before 9 December.
Corunna	United Kingdom	The ship was driven ashore at Lowestoft, Suffolk. She was on a voyage from Newcastle upon Tyne, Northumberland to Constantinople, Ottoman Empire. She was refloated on 9 January 1856 and taken in to Lowestoft in a leaky condition.
Countess of Galloway	United Kingdom	The paddle steamer was driven ashore and damaged in Garlieston Bay.
Crescent City	United States	The steamship was wrecked on the Mattevia Reef in the Bahamas Banks. All on board survived. She was on a voyage from New York to New Orleans, Louisiana.
Duke of Wellington	United Kingdom	The ship foundered off the Keeling Islands before 24 December. All on board were rescued. She was on a voyage from London to Calcutta, India.
Gefion	Denmark	The ship was driven ashore and wrecked near "Morufstange", Sweden before 14 December. Her crew survived. She was on a voyage from Newcastle upon Tyne to Copenhagen.
George and Aloys	United Kingdom	The ship was lost in the Black Sea with some loss of live.
George and Mary	United Kingdom	The ship was sighted in Tor Bay whilst on a voyage from the River Tyne to Constantinople. No further trace, presumed foundered with the loss of all hands.
Germania	United Kingdom	The ship was driven ashore on Inagua, Bahamas. She was on a voyage from Jacmel, Haiti to Falmouth, Cornwall. She was refloated and taken in to Nassau, Bahamas, arriving on 29 December.
Hindostan	United Kingdom	The ship ran aground and capsized on St. George's Bank before 27 December. She was a total loss.
Ianthe	United Kingdom	The brig was abandoned in the Atlantic Ocean before 15 December. Her crew were rescued by Vibilia (United Kingdom). Ianthe was on a voyage from Seville, Spain to Sunderland, County Durham.
Johanna	Netherlands	The barque was wrecked on the Pratas Shoal, in the South China Sea before 15 December. She was on a voyage from Manila, Spanish East Indies to Shanghai, China.
John	United Kingdom	The ship was driven ashore at Tynemouth, Northumberland. She was refloated on 1 January 1856 but sank in the River Tyne.
Lady Camilla	United Kingdom	The ship was lost in the North Sea after 5 December. She was on a voyage from London to Aberdeen.
Mail	United Kingdom	The steamship ran aground on the North Bull, in the Irish Sea off the coast of County Dublin. She was refloated on 5 December.
Margaret	United Kingdom	The ship was wrecked near Crail, Fife. She was on a voyage from Stettin to Leith, Lothian.
Naiad	United Kingdom	The ship was driven ashore at Seaton Carew, County Durham. She was on a voyage from London to Hartlepool, County Durham. She was refloated on 21 December and taken in to Blyth, Northumberland.
Nautilus	United Kingdom	The ship was driven ashore on the Spanish coast. She was on a voyage from Sunderland to Gallipoli, Ottoman Empire. She was refloated and taken in to Málaga, Spain, where she arrived on 12 January.
Ne Adelfotis	Greece	The brig was driven ashore and wrecked at Sulina between 18 and 20 December. Her crew were rescued.
Nicolai Jovan	Flag unknown	The ship was driven ashore at "Havaz", Ottoman Empire before 27 December. She was on a voyage from Cardiff, Glamorgan to Constantinople. She was refloated.
Potsdam	Prussia	The barque was driven ashore and wrecked at Trabizond, Ottoman Empire before 28 December.
Rainbow	United Kingdom	The steamship was driven ashore near Brielle, South Holland, Netherlands before 9 December. She was refloated on 22 December and resumed her voyage.
HMS Royal Albert	Royal Navy	The ship of the line sprang a leak and was beached at San Nicholas, Kea, Greece. She was on a voyage from the Crimea to Malta.
San Giorgio	Austrian Empire	The trabaccolo was driven ashore and wrecked at Sulina between 18 and 20 December. Her crew were rescued.
San Giorgio Vantaciano	Moldavia	The ship was driven ashore and wrecked at Sulina between 18 and 20 December with the loss of all 23 crew.
San Nicolo	Moldavia	The brig was driven ashore and wrecked at Sulina between 18 and 20 December. Her crew were rescued.
Siam	United Kingdom	The ship struck a reef off Tybee Island, Georgia, United States and was beached. She was on a voyage from Liverpool to Savannah, Georgia. She was consequently condemned, but was sold and later towed in to Savannah for repairs.
Sophia	United Kingdom	The ship was wrecked on the Goodwin Sands, Kent in early December. Her crew were rescued by the lifeboat Northumberland (United Kingdom).
Standard	United Kingdom	The ship foundered in the Skagerrak off the Koster Islands, Sweden before 7 December.
Triumph	United Kingdom	The ship foundered in the Indian Ocean between 22 and 26 December. Her crew were rescued by Canning (United Kingdom). Triumph was on a voyage from Calcutta, India to Mauritius.
Vertranen	Rostock	The ship was driven ashore near "Morufstange" before 14 December. Her crew were rescued. She was on a voyage from Grangemouth, Stirlingshire, United Kingdom to Rostock.
Wolff	Stettin	The ship was driven ashore near "Morufstange" before 14 December. Her crew were rescued. She was on a voyage from Hartlepool to Stettin.
Zephir	Norway	The brig was driven ashore and wrecked at Sulina between 18 and 20 December. Her crew were rescued.
