= Middle Ground (New Rochelle) =

Middle Ground (40.89538°N 73.75902°W) is a large submerged reef in Long Island Sound and part of the city of New Rochelle, Westchester County, New York. This underwater embankment formed from the natural accumulation of rock and sand in shallow coastal waters. Rock outcrops just below the surface at the center of Middle Ground become exposed during low tide. Stripers and bluefish are attracted to the shoal throughout the warmer season.
