= Kilchousland Chapel =

Coordinates: 55.4405°N 5.5559°W

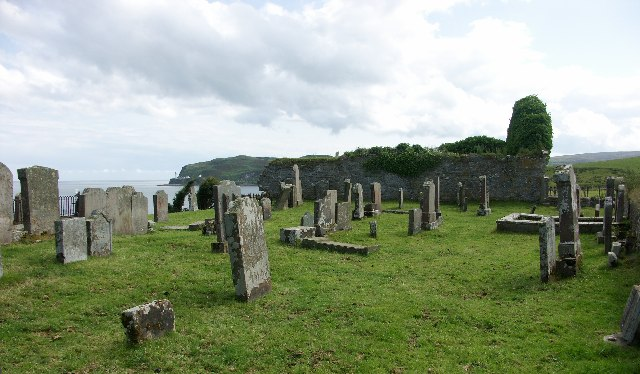
Kilchousland Chapel

Kilchousland Chapel (Scottish Gaelic: Chill Chuslainn "St Constantine's Chapel") is a medieval chapel near Campbeltown, Argyll and Bute, Scotland. Built in the 12th century, the chapel was dedicated to St. Constantine.
