= Barren Island (Maryland) =

Island in Dorchester County, Maryland, United States

Barren Island is small, uninhabited landmass in the Chesapeake Bay, just off the coast of Dorchester County, Maryland. It is located at 38°20′4.13″N 76°15′11.44″W. It is known to be a mute swan nesting ground.

== Ecological Restoration ==
The Friends of Blackwater Refuge worked in conjunction with the National Aquarium in Baltimore on a major marsh restoration project at Barren Island in the Chesapeake Bay. Barren Island is located twelve miles south of the Choptank River and is part of the Chesapeake Marshlands National Wildlife Refuge Complex; the island is adjacent to the Blackwater National Wildlife Refuge.

The efforts of this partnership, which includes the U.S. Army Corps of Engineers, NOAA, the FWS, the National Fish and Wildlife Foundation, and Maryland Conservation Corps have resulted in the planting of over 302,000 native marsh grasses with the help of 927 volunteers totaling 7,700 volunteer hours.

Aquarium staff and the Friends of Blackwater Refuge have returned to the site semi-annually to monitor the success of the restoration project. Topographic, vegetative and fish utilization data have been collected. Initial monitoring indicates that the project has been successful as wave energy is being absorbed and sediment is in fact being accreted. A very natural marsh community which includes small invertebrates that live in the sediments, larger invertebrates including crabs and shrimp and fish and birds can be found in the more mature parts of the site that were planted in 2001. The more recently planted areas appear to be progressing well toward a similar community.
