= Gullholmen =

Town in Sweden

Coordinates: 58°11′N 11°24′E

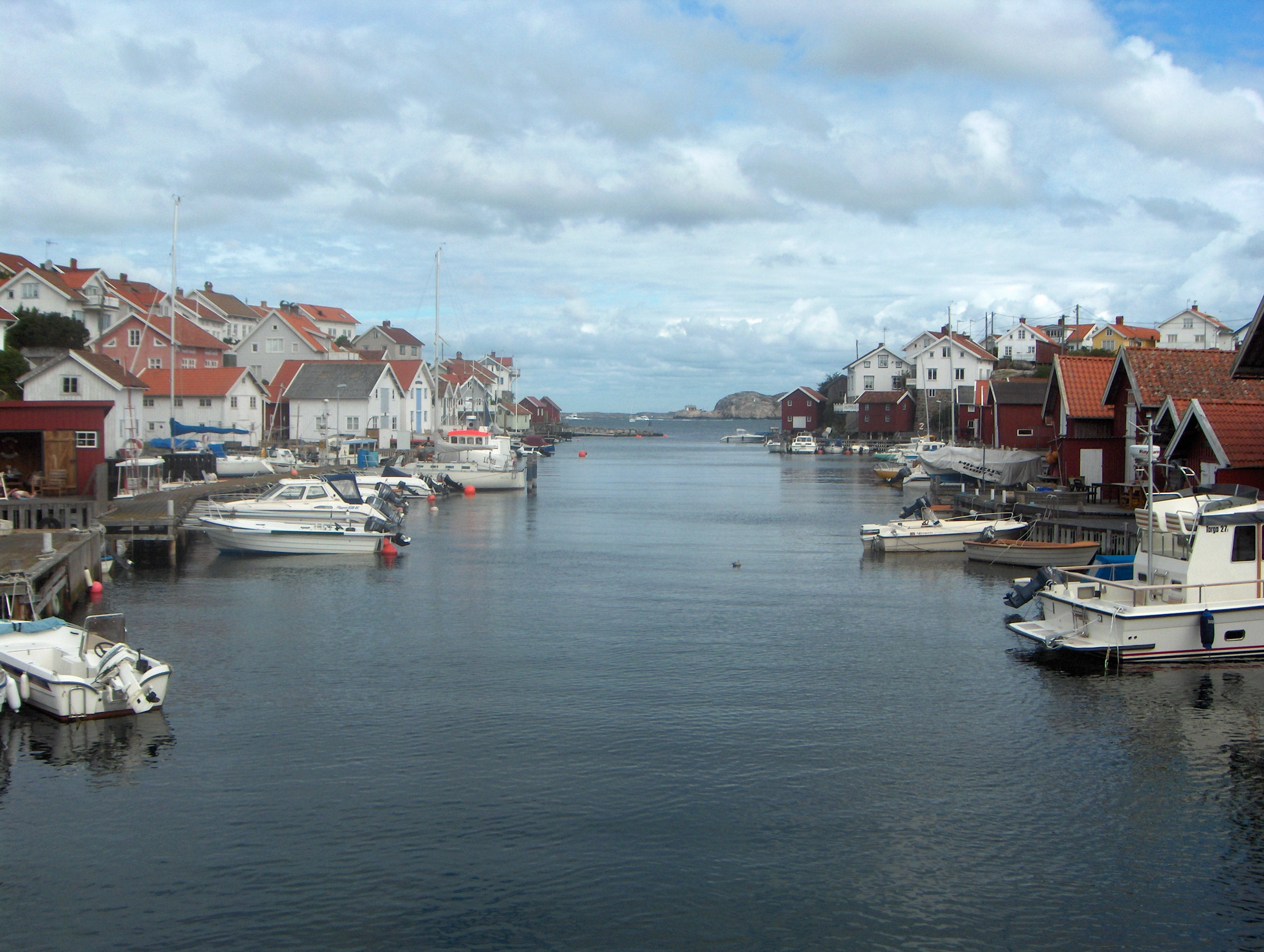
Gullholmen

Gullholmen is a small island in Sweden's Orust Municipality. The island is notable for the absence of car traffic, and is serviced by a passenger ferry multiple times per day from the neighbouring island of Orust Its municipalsamhälle had 651 inhabitants in 1900.
