= Lule River =

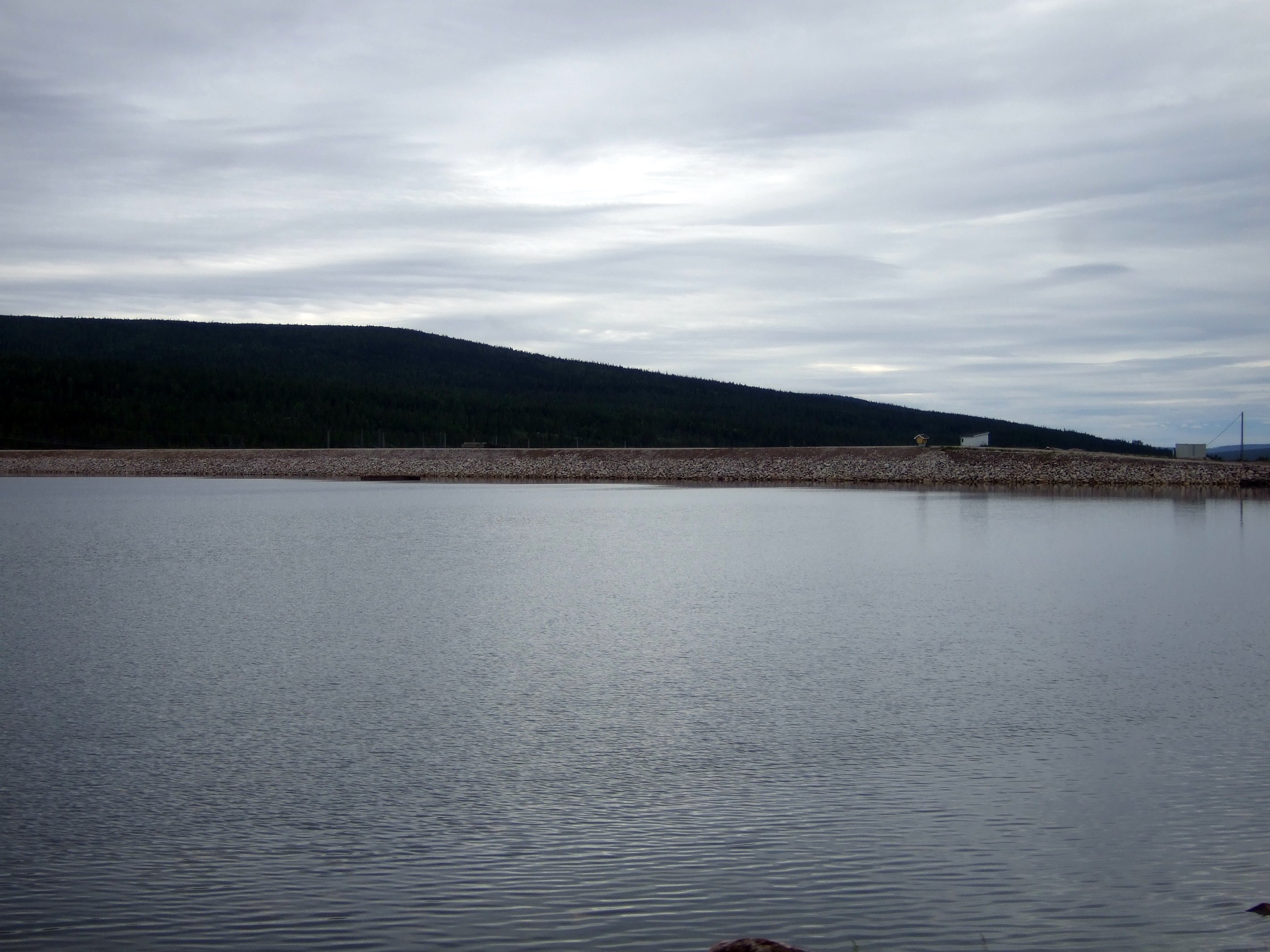
- Harsprånget in Lule River, August 2007

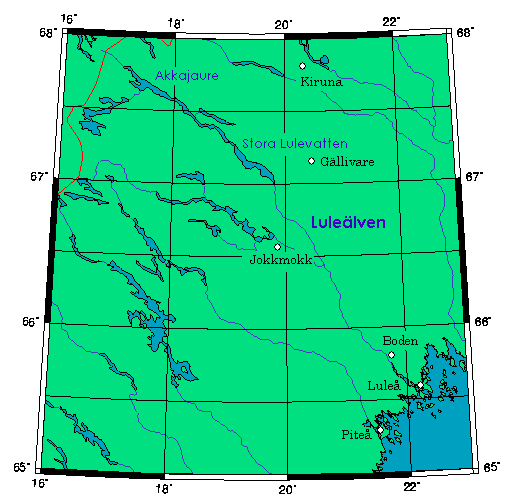
- Location of Lule älv
- Native name: Julevädno (Lule Sami); Lule älv (Swedish); Luleälven (Swedish)

Location
- Country: Sweden, Norway

Physical characteristics
- Source: Sårjåsjaure
- Mouth: Gulf of Bothnia
  - location: Luleå, Norrbotten, Sweden
  - coordinates: 65°35′12″N 22°02′31″E
  - elevation: 0 m (0 ft)
- Length: 450 km (280 mi)
- Basin size: 25,240.5 km^{2} (9,745.4 sq mi)
- Discharge
  - average: 515 m^{3}/s (18,200 cu ft/s)

Lule River (Lule Sami: Julevädno, Swedish: Lule älv, Luleälven) is a major river in Sweden, rising in northern Sweden and flowing southeast for 460 km (290 mi) before reaching the Gulf of Bothnia at Luleå. It is the second largest river by watershed area and length in Norrbotten County (after the Torne River and very slightly ahead of the Kalix River, which is 460.65 km long), but is the largest by average discharge.

It has a watershed of 25,240.5 km^{2} of which 24,545.6 km^{2} is in Sweden and 694.9 km^{2} in Norway.

The river is an important source of hydroelectric energy, with major hydroelectric plants at Porjus and the 977 MW Harsprånget, commissioned in 1952 and expanded in 1983 to become Sweden's largest hydro power station. The waterfall Harsprånget previously found at the location (former name: Njommelsaska) was the largest waterfall on the Swedish Lule River.

The river was used extensively for the transportation of timber, with logs floated downstream for processing at Luleå, but this stopped in the early 1980s.

== Course ==
The Greater Lule River (Big Lule River) arguably begins somewhere near Bajep Sårjåsjávrre in Norway, just east of Blåmannsisen glacier. The water flows over the border to the Virihaure lake in Padjelanta National Park, which also collects water from Kerkevare (via Kettaurejokk) and Alkajaure (via Millätno). The Tukejokk joins the Lule as well in Virihaure. Leaving Virihaure to the north, the river reaches the Vastenjaure lake after losing 32m over 2.2 km. It then flows via the Vuojatätno to lake Kutjaure and then Luoktanjarkajaure, collecting a lot of water from other lakes in Sarek National Park, like Salohaure, and from the Swedish-Norwegian border, before entering the Akkajaure reservoir, which has a storage capacity in excess of 6 km^{3}, constituting the largest man-made lake in Sweden.

The creation and expansion of the reservoir as well as the later added power plant Vietas meant the curtailment of flow downstream to the waterfall Stora Sjöfallet, where the water falls 39.6 m from Kårtjejaure to Langasjaure and which used to be known as one of the most impressive waterfalls in Sweden. In the latter of the lakes, the Vietasajokk joins the Lule, nowadays also through the aforementioned powerplant. After Langas, the river drops 2 meters in a small section of rapids known as Jaurekaska into Stora Lulevatten, which is the largest of the lakes in the river.

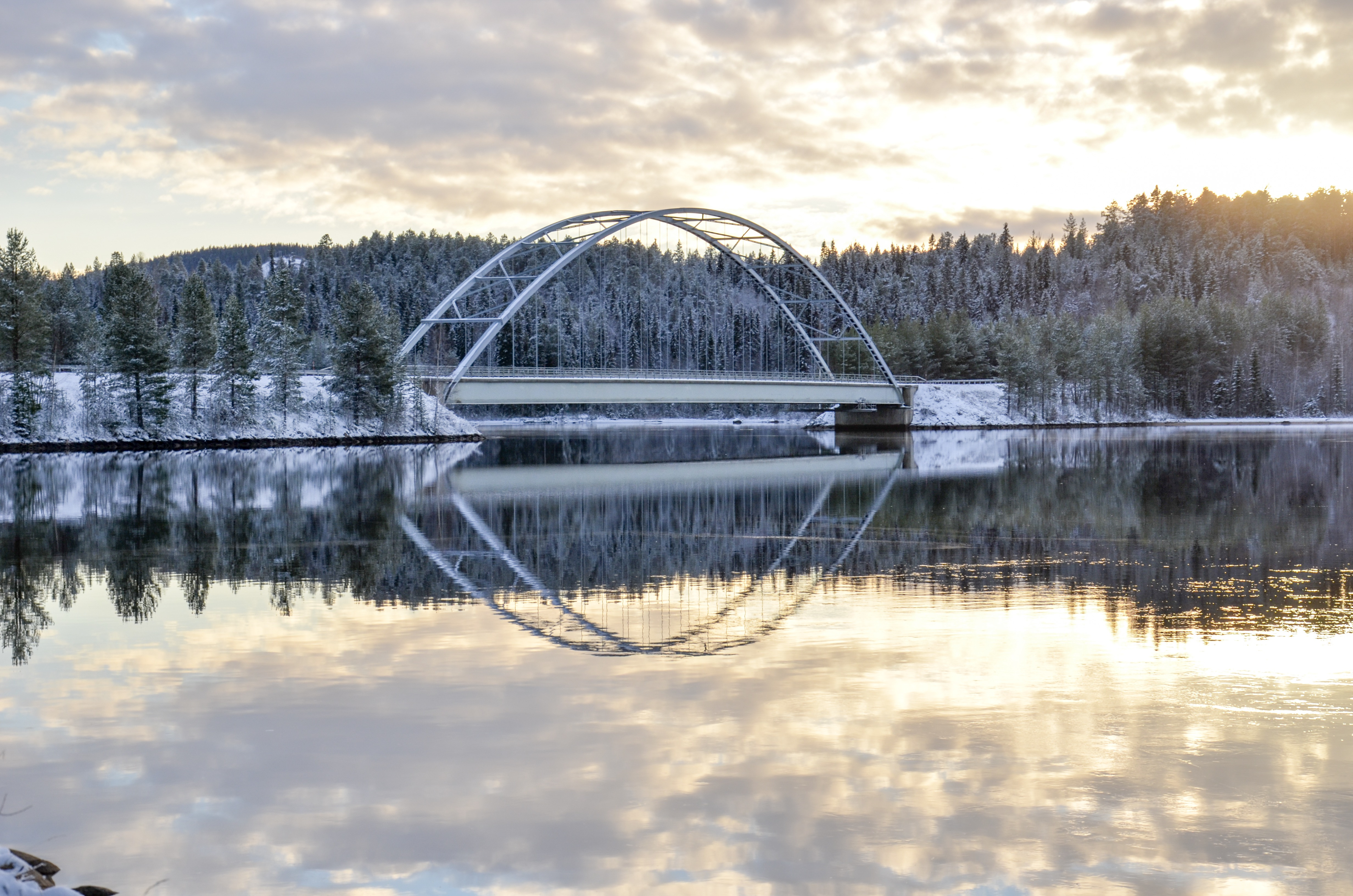
Bridge over Lule river at Vuollerim, near the village of Porsi

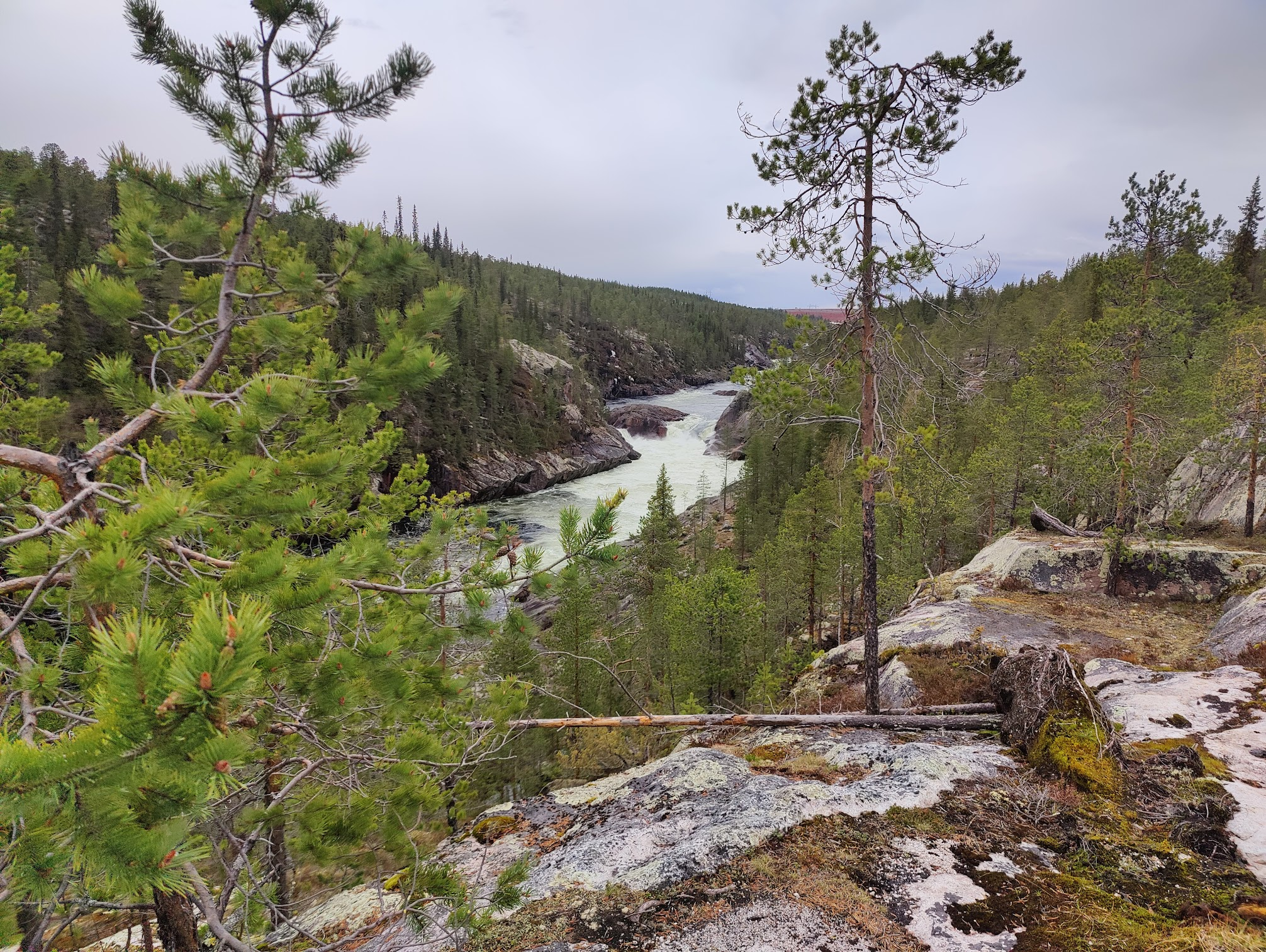
The Lule River at Harsprånget, downstream of the main fall, during a release of water from the upstream power plant in what normally at present is a dry riverbed through a rocky, v-shaped valley.

The 20 km long stretch between the outlet of Stora Lulevatten and just downstream of Ligga is particularly noteworthy for its geology and topography. Whereas the topsoil along the shore for most of the course is constituted of moraine, the river banks along this particular stretch are largely constituted of exposed bedrock. In this section, the river alters considerably to rather have the characteristics of a mountain torrent than a large river, as in its natural state, it drops more than 207 meters through a nearly continuous series of rapids and waterfalls, including those at Porjus and Harsprånget in what partly was constituted of a deep, narrow gorge, sometimes over 40 meters deep. The sustained gradient for this section is around 1%, which is extremely steep for a river of the size, considering its average flow rate here reaches 270 m^{3}/s. The sustained, concentrated drop combined with the river's high average flow rate affords the three hydroelectric power plants along the segment, namely Porjus, Harsprånget and Ligga a combined hydroelectric potential that rivals Ulla-Førre or all the power plants along the High Rhine in productivity, as this corridor alone produces an annual average of 4.2 TWh, or 30% of the production on the entire river system, including tributaries. It is believed that the river's course in pre-glacial times downstream of Stora Lulevatten went through the Råne River valley. Later, it's believed that the river broke its present more southernly course through stream capture by the present right tributary Pakkojokk along fracture zones, with the resulting increased flow rate eroding the deeply incised valley downstream of Stora Lulevatten.

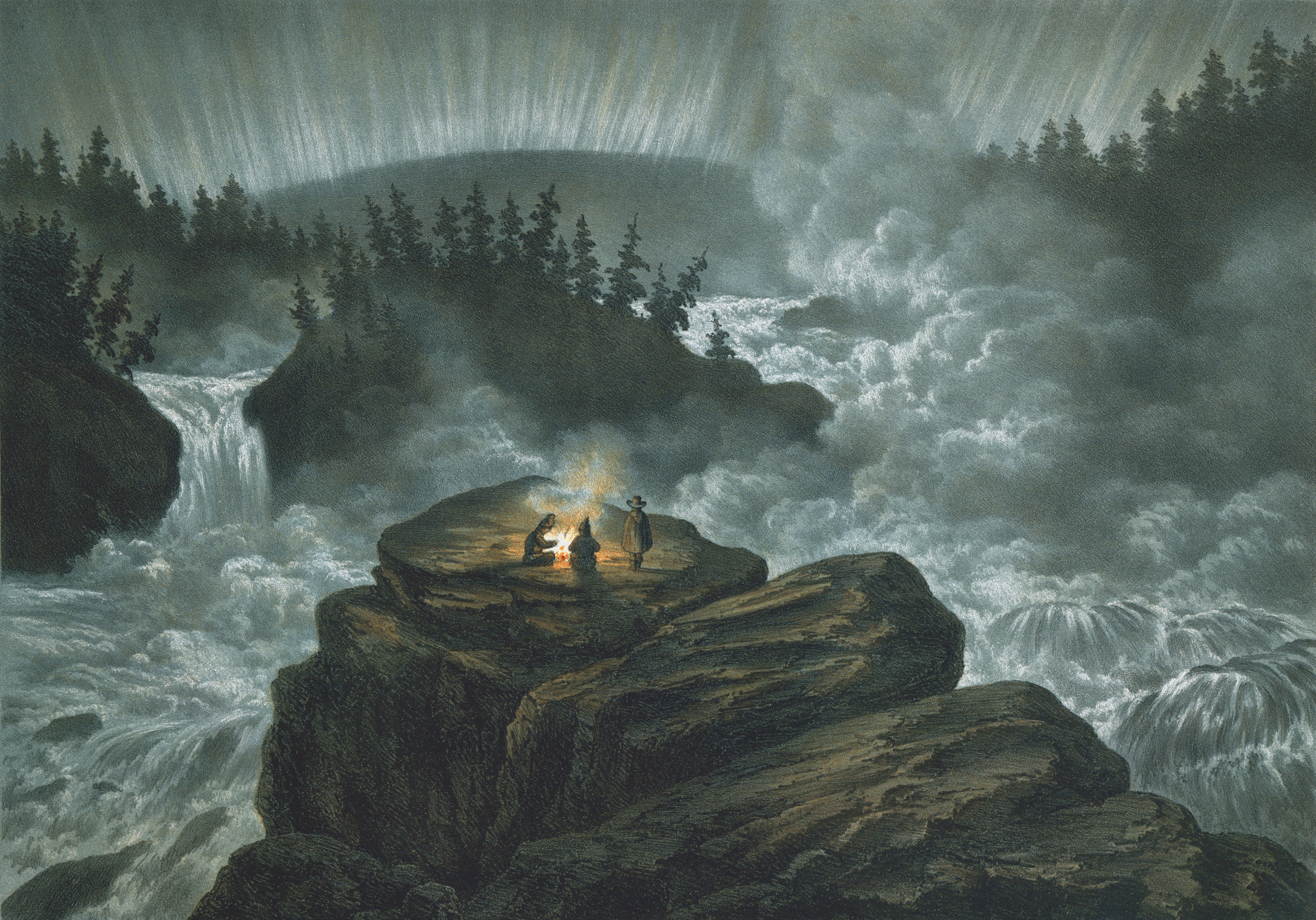
This 1856 lithograph shows the waterfall Harsprånget in the polar night with the aurora borealis. The waterfall Harsprånget (former name: Njommelsaska) was the largest waterfall on the Swedish Lule River but has been dammed for hydroelectricity.

Downstream of Ligga, the river drops another 87 meters over 25 km. In its natural state, this stretch was made up of several, continuous rapids, whereas today, this section is wholly made up of the Messaure reservoir, which is dammed by a 2 km long, 100 m tall rock-fill dam, the largest in Sweden, where said drop is exploited for power generation. At this segment, the main river is joined by the Muddus River from Muddus National Park.

Downstream, at 75m above sea level, near the village of Vuollerim, the river joins with the Lesser Lule River. The Lule passes the Porsiforsen (25m over 2 km), Edefors and Hedens fors, rapids that nowadays all likewise have been exploited for power generation. It flows into the Baltic Sea through the Bälingefjärden and Lulefjärden.

The name of the town Luleå means "Lule River"; the river's name is from the Sami lulij meaning "Easterner", a name for Forest Sami people.

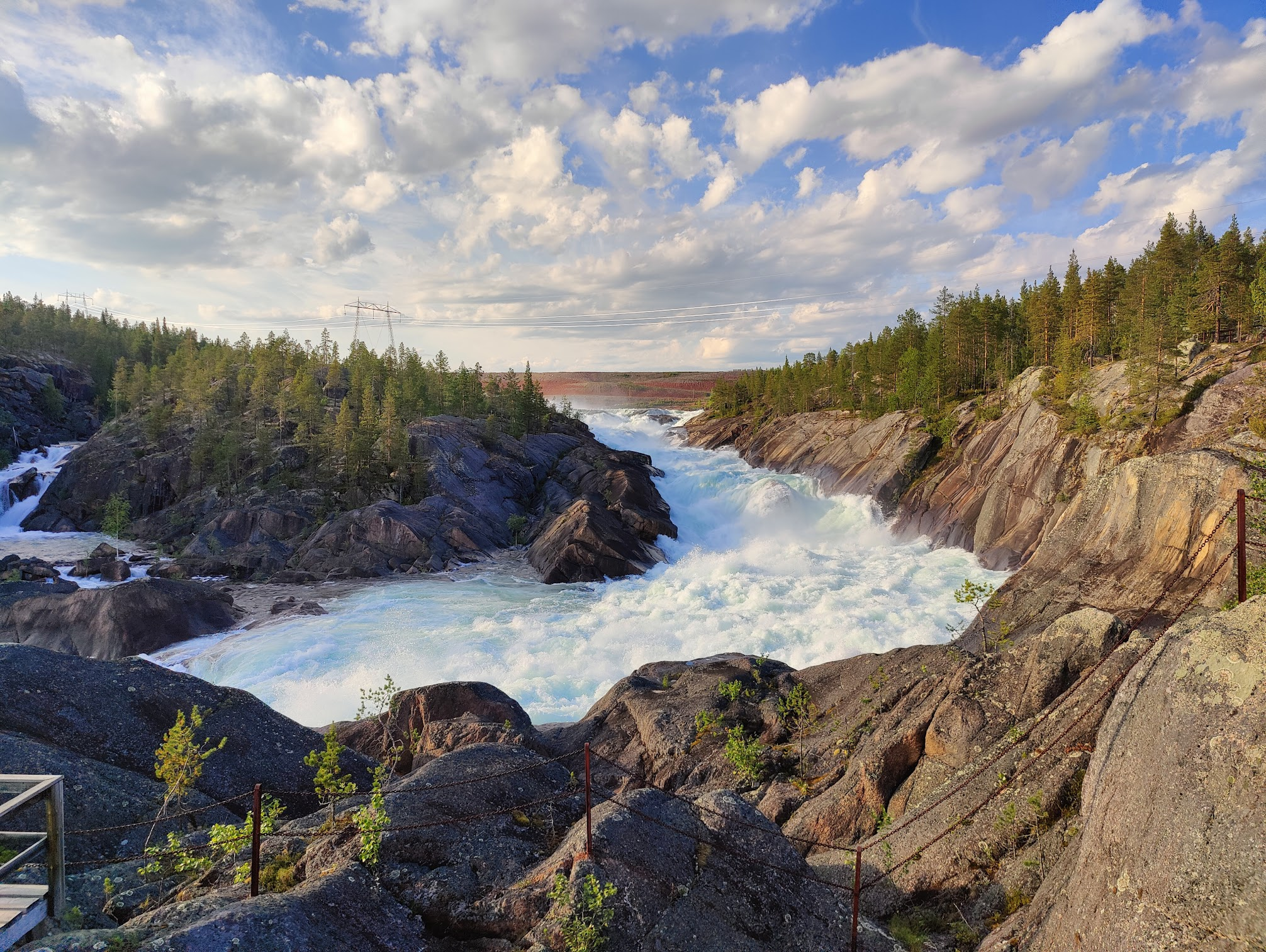
The waterfall Harsprånget in present day, during a release of water into the usually dry riverbed from the upstream power plant.

Other rivers in the watershed of the Lule with a length of more than 100 km are: Blackälven, Flarkån, Lesser Lule River, Pärlälven, Rissajåkkå, Vietasätno, and Bodträskån.

== Hydroelectric power stations ==
Total nameplate capacity is around 4.1 GW. With an annual average electricity production of 13.7 TWh, with the record year of 2022 exceeding 17 TWh, it's not only the by far most important river for hydroelectric power generation in Sweden, alone making up 21% of all hydropower generation and as of 2024 also around 8% of Sweden's total electricity generation, but also when including its main tributary Lesser Lule river one of the most productive river basins in Europe excluding Russia, behind only the Danube, Rhine, Rhône and Po river basins.

All power stations in the river system are owned by Vattenfall AB.

Power station	Entered service	Annual production. (GW·h)	Nameplate capacity (MW)	River	Notes
Ritsem	1977	481	320	Vietasätno	Transfers water from lake Sitasaure to Akkajaure through a 17 km long tunnel
Vietas	1971	1,123	320	Greater Lule River, Vietasätno	Uses water from Akkajaure and Sádijávrre
Porjus	1915	1,233	422	Greater Lule River	New station built in 1982
Harsprånget	1951	2,131	811	Greater Lule River	Largest plant by nameplate capacity in Sweden. Expanded between 1974-1983 with two new generators. Oldest generator idled.
Ligga	1954	791	320	Greater Lule River	Expanded between 1977-1982 with a new generator
Messaure	1963	1,827	428	Greater Lule River	Largest dam by volume in Sweden
Seitevare	1967	787	201	Blackälven	Dams a tributary to the Lesser Lule river. Second largest reservoir by volume in the river system at 1.7 km^{3}
Parki	1970	85	19	Lesser Lule river	
Randi	1976	226	85	Lesser Lule river	
Akkats	1973	565	156	Lesser Lule river	Sluice gates and inlet house are decorated in art by Bengt Lindström and Lars Pirak
Letsi	1967	1,850	474	Lesser Lule river	Uses a 6 km long tunnel to transfer water to the Greater Lule river above the two rivers' natural confluence, resulting in a 17 km long mostly dry riverbed
Porsi	1961	1,145	273	Lule river	Expanded in 1984-1987 with a new generator
Laxede	1962	885	200	Lule river	Expanded in 1982 with a new generator
Vittjärv	1974	175	31	Lule river	Built on a concrete base plate
Boden	1971	455	75	Lule river	
Total		13,759	4 135		

== Fortifications ==
During the 19th and 20th centuries, the river was designated as a defensive line against an invasion from Imperial Russia and subsequently the Soviet Union. Extensive fortifications exist along the entire length of the river, culminating in Bodens Fortress in and around the city of Boden. Most of these fortifications and bunkers are no longer in use.
