= Bodträskån =

Coordinates: 66°05′N 20°57′E

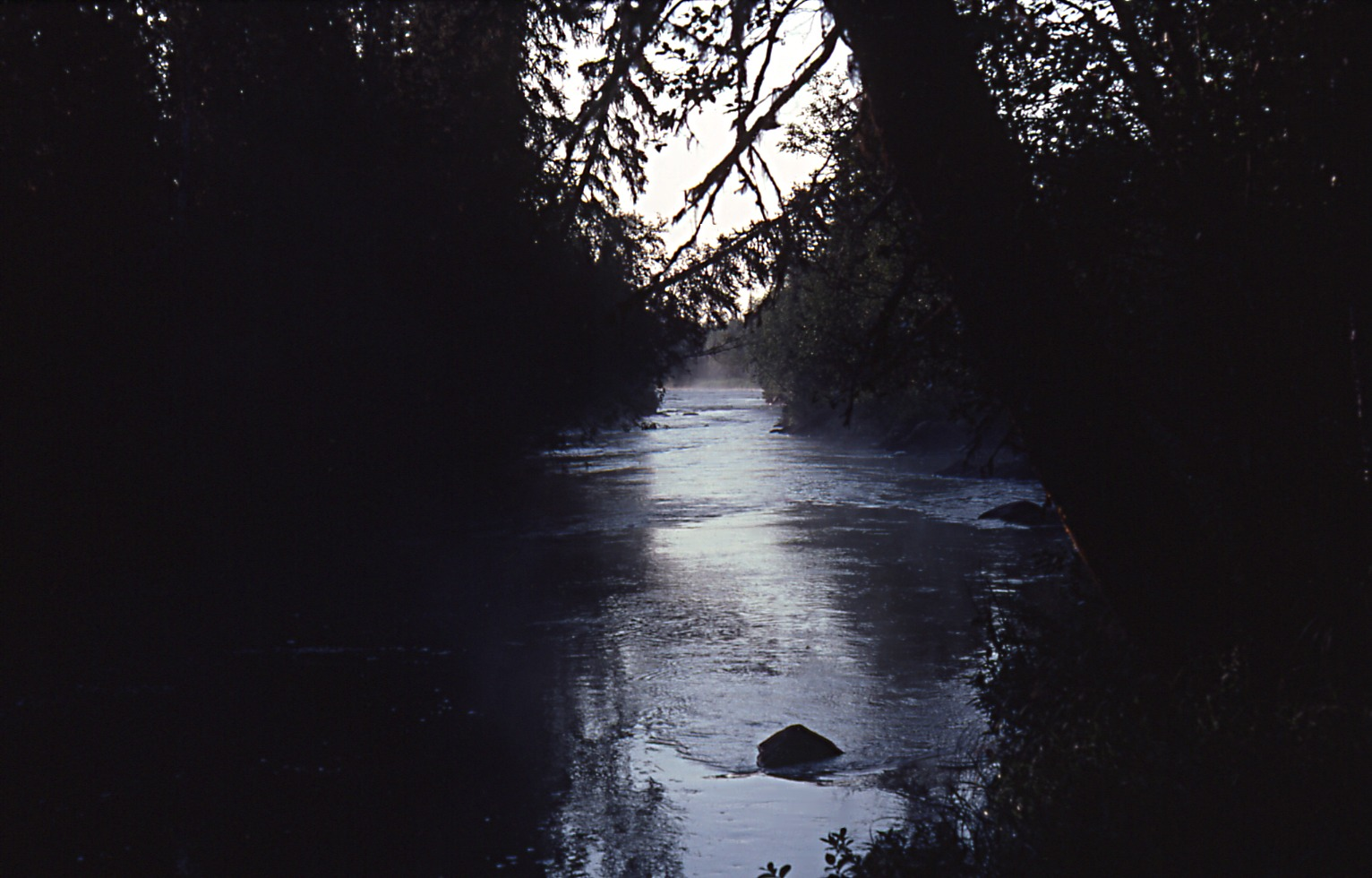

Location
- Country: Sweden

Physical characteristics
- Length: 80 km (50 mi)
- Basin size: 1,330 km^{2} (510 sq mi)

The Bodträskån ("Bodträsk River") is a small river that flows into Lule River in Norrbotten, Sweden.

== Description ==
The river starts in Jokkmokk municipality and ends at Bodträskfors, a small village, in Edefors parish. Until the 1950s the Bodträskån was quite important but today its importance is minuscule. The village of Bodträskfors houses an impressive mansion building from 1870.

== See also ==
- Lule River
- Jokkmokk Municipality
- Norrbotten
- Sweden
