= Talvatissjön =

Lake in Jokkmokk Municipality, Sweden

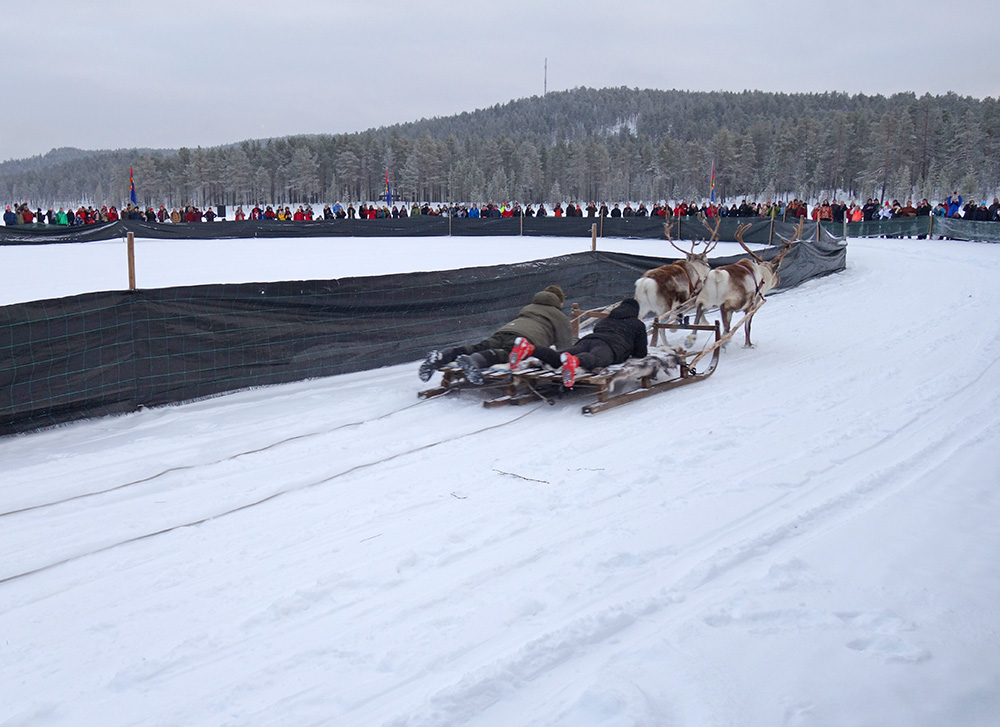
- Reindeer racing on Talvatissjön, 2017

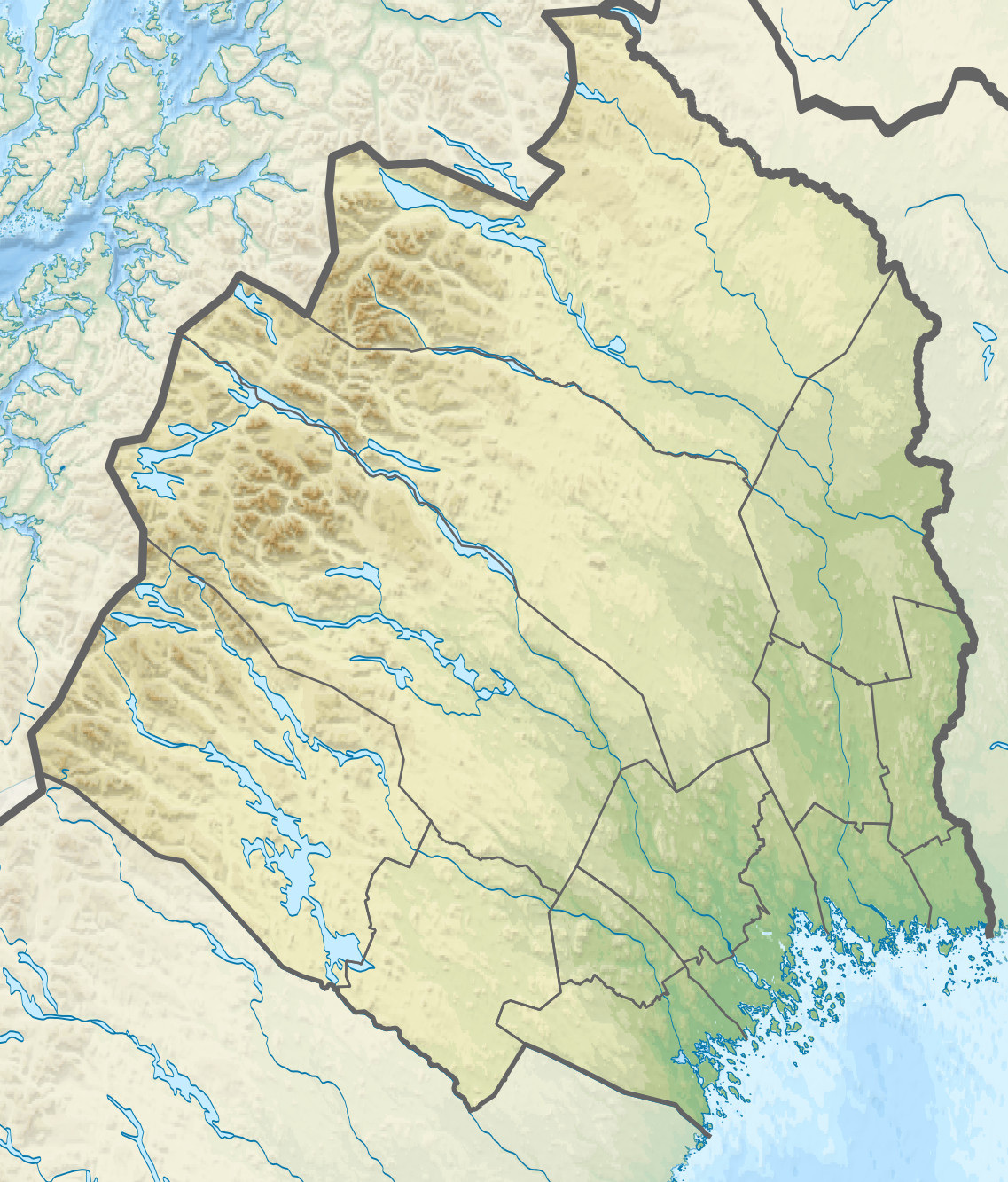
- Location within Norrbotten Location within Sweden
- Location: Jokkmokk, Sweden
- Coordinates: 66°30′N 19°54′E
- Basin countries: Sweden
- Surface area: 01.66 km^{2} (0.64 sq mi)
- Surface elevation: 240 m (790 ft)

Talvatissjön is a lake in the Jokkmokk Municipality in Lapland and is part of the Lule River's main catchment area. The lake has an area of 0.166 square kilometers and is 240 meters above sea level. The lake is dewatered by the watercourse Talvatissjöbäcken. It is adjacent to the town of Jokkmokk. The name comes from the Sami name of Lake Dálvvadisjávrasj, after Dálvvadis, the traditional Sami name of Jokkmokk, which is Sami for lake.
