= Pärlälven =

River in Lapland, Sweden

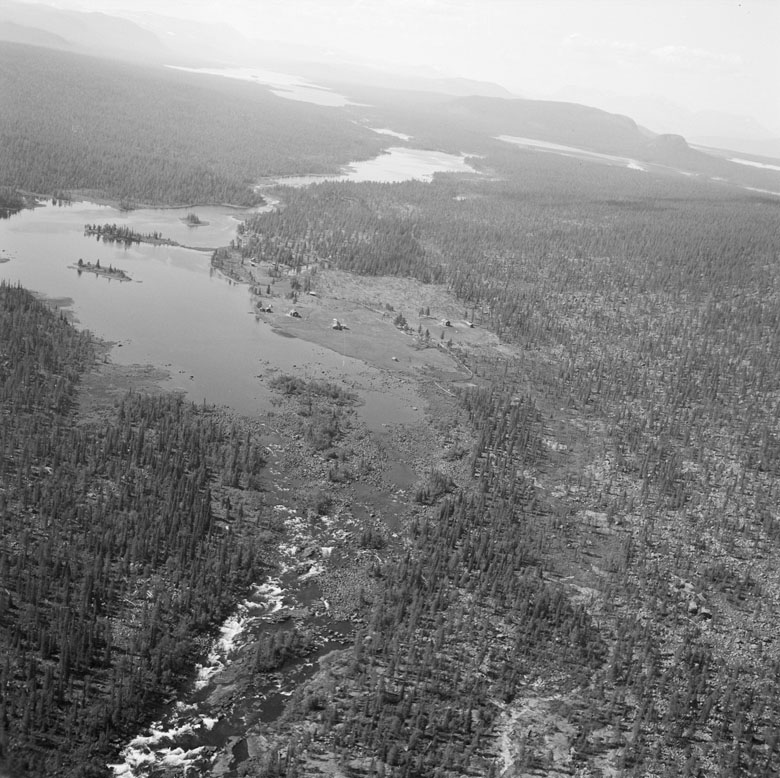
- The outflow of Pärlälven in Karats from Peuraure

Location
- Country: Sweden
- County: Norrbotten County

Physical characteristics
- Source
  - location: Arjeplog Municipality, Sweden
- Mouth: Lesser Lule River
  - location: Purkijaure, Sweden
  - coordinates: 66°36′26″N 19°29′05″E
- Length: 139 km
- Basin size: 2296 km²

Pärlälven (English: Pearl River) is a 139 km long river in Lapland, Norrbotten County, a tributary to the Lesser Lule River, with a drainage basin of 2296 km^{2}. The source is in Arjeplog Municipality, but almost the entire river flows through Jokkmokk Municipality. It flows through the lakes Peuraure, Karats, and Piertinjaure, and finally joins the Lesser Lule River in Purkijaure, a few miles west of Jokkmokk. The river is popular with sport fishers. In the 18th century, freshwater pearl mussels were fished in the river, hence the river's name.

== See also ==
- List of rivers of Sweden
