= Stubba =

Nature reserve in Gällivare municipality, Sweden

Coordinates: 67.11°N 20.00°E

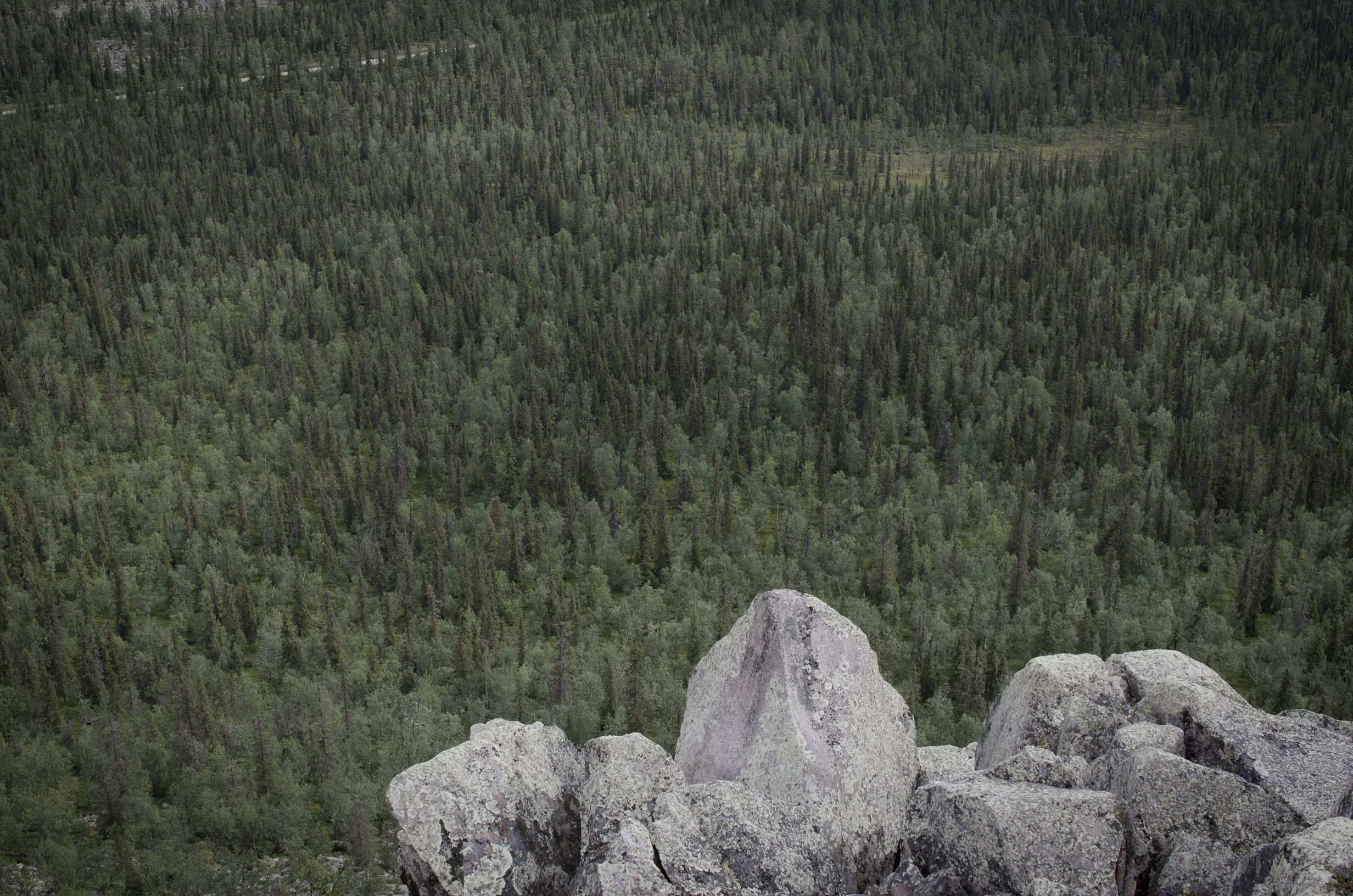
View from Oarjemus Stubbá at the Border of Muddus national park and Stubba nature reserve

Stubba is a nature reserve and Natura 2000 area in Gällivare in Sweden, part of the UNESCO World Heritage Site Laponia in Swedish Lapland, with an area of 350 km². Together with the nature reserve Sjaunja (Sjávnja) and Muddus National Park it covers the biggest wetland in Sweden.

The nature reserve was formed in 1988, and expanded 1996 and 2011.

The Inlandsbanan railway and European route E45, here coinciding with the Inlandsvägen tourist road, go through the nature reserve. There are also bike and snowmobile routes through it. Hiking, camping, lighting campfires and picking berries and edible mushrooms is allowed.
