= Jokkmokk Church =

Coordinates: 66°36′17.48″N 19°50′30.85″E

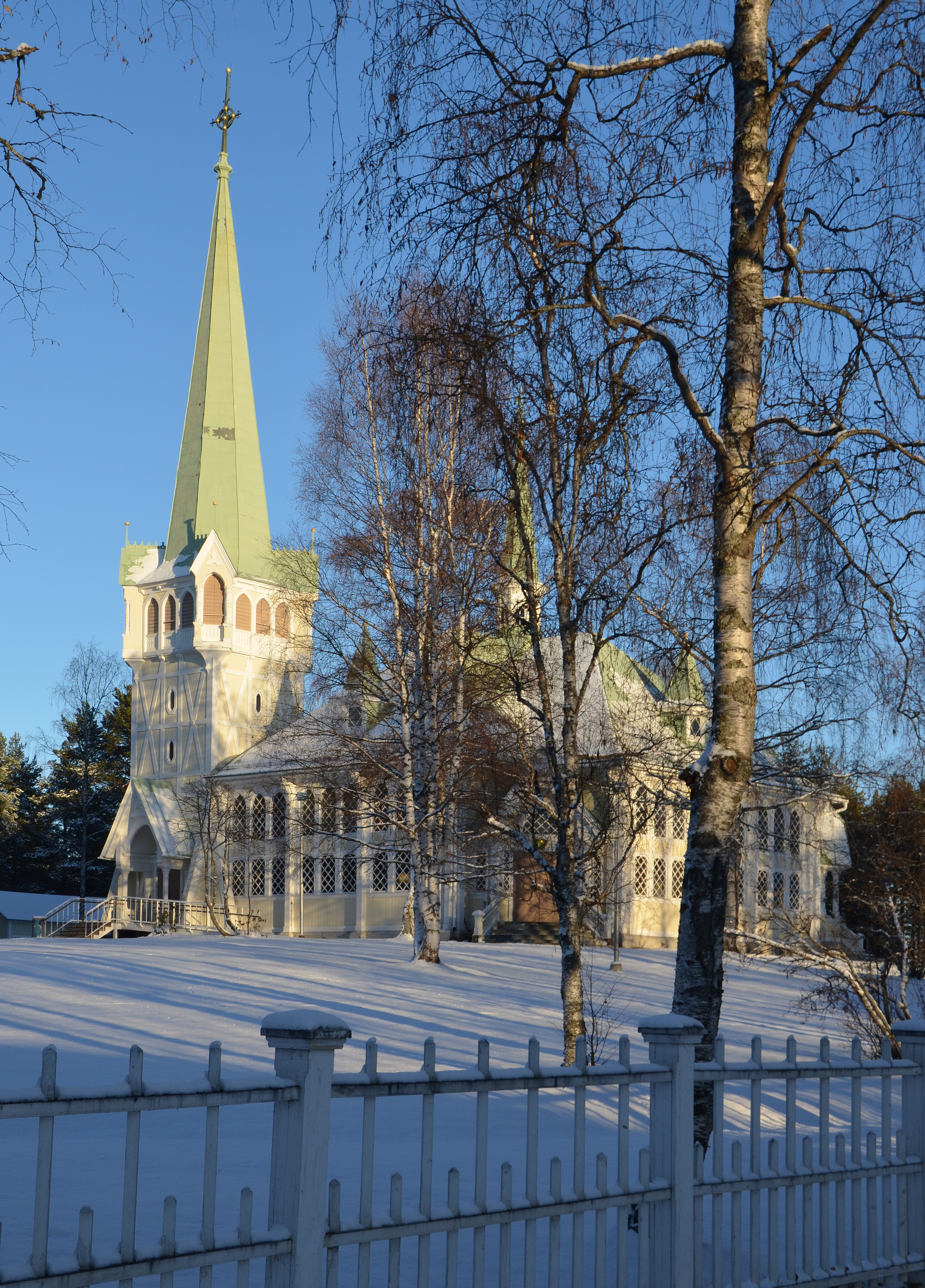
- Location: Jokkmokk
- Country: Sweden
- Website: Jokkmokk Church

Jokkmokk Church (also known as Jokkmokk New Church) is a church in Jokkmokk in the Jokkmokk Municipality. It is the parish church.

== Architecture and history ==
The church is a Gothic Revival architecture church and is built of wood. Construction began in 1888 and was completed and opened for service in 1889. A vestry was added in 1961.

The church was designed by E.A. Jacobsson and has a squashed flat shape that includes a side tower.

== Details ==
The altarpiece, an oil painting, depicts Jesus' last supper and was painted by Torsten Nordberg in 1949. The baptismal font is carved from raw birch. The font, along with the base of the organ, was renovated with the church's restoration in 1949 by Runo Johansson Lette.

== Sources ==
- Länsstyrelsen i Norrbottens län om Jokkmokks nya kyrka
