= Laponia =

Wildlife area in the Lapland province in northern Sweden

Laponian Area
UNESCO World Heritage Site
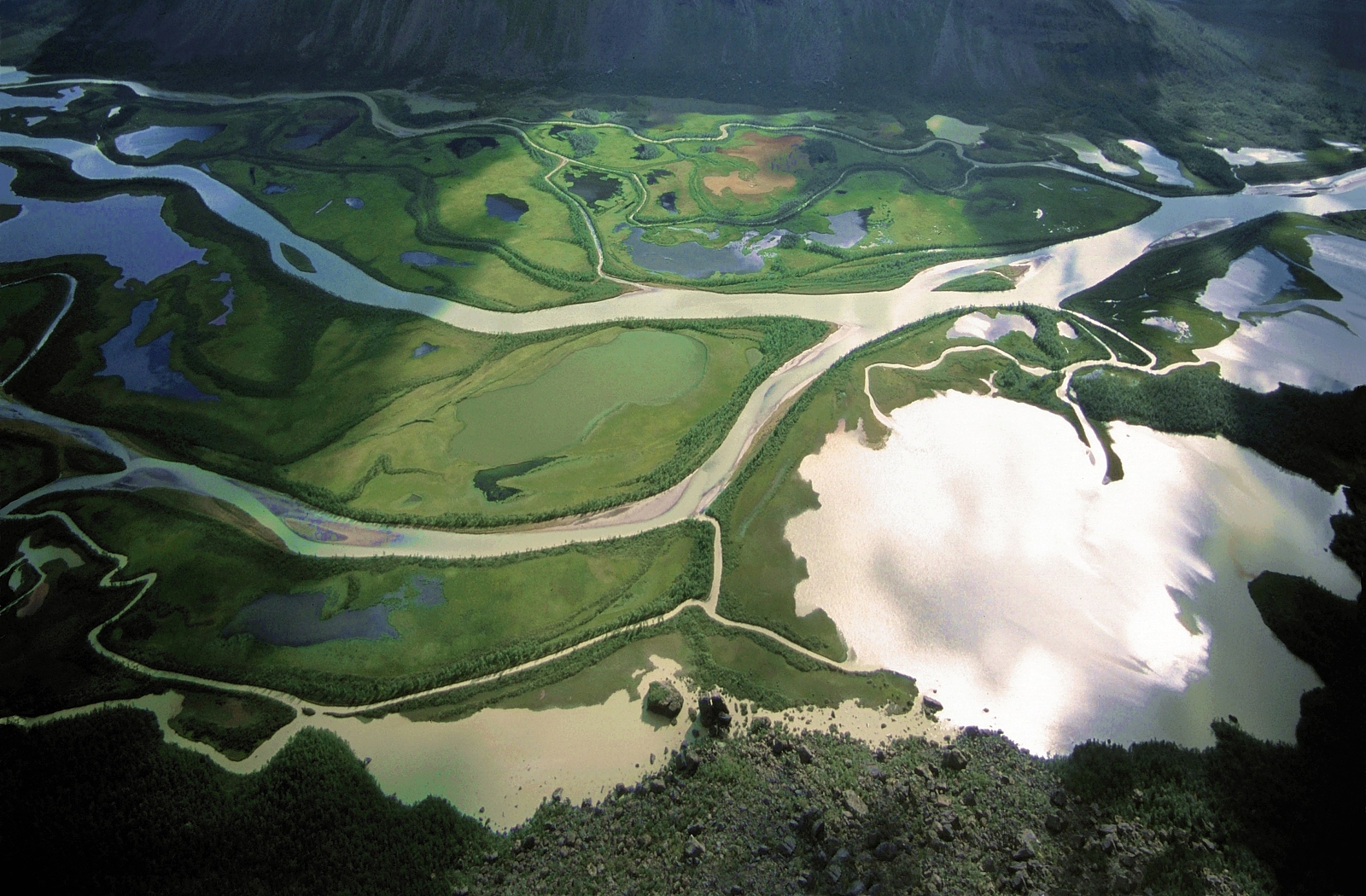
- An example of the naturesque wilderness

- Location within Sweden
- Location: Lapland, Sweden
- Includes: Stora Sjöfallet National Park, Stubba nature reserve, Padjelanta National Park, Sarek National Park, Sjaunja Nature Reserve, Muddus National Park
- Criteria: Cultural and Natural: (iii), (vii), (viii), (ix), (v)
- Reference: 774
- Inscription: 1996 (20th Session)
- Area: 940,900 ha (3,633 sq mi)
- Coordinates: 67°20′N 17°35′E

Laponia, or the Laponian Area, is a large mountainous wildlife area in the Lapland province in northern Sweden, more precisely in Gällivare Municipality, Arjeplog Municipality and Jokkmokk Municipality. The name comes from the Latin name for Lapland.

It was made a UNESCO World Heritage Site in 1996; the bulk of it had enjoyed protected status since the early 20th century. The area was made a heritage site for both natural and cultural reasons.

The total area is about 9,400 square kilometres (3,600 sq mi), making it the world's largest unmodified nature area to be still cultured by natives—the natives in this case being the reindeer-herding Sami people. Only parts of the area is actually used for pasture by them. With such a large space, the geography of the area varies greatly; it is dominated by mountains, rivers and lakes. Each nature reserve and national park has its distinctive features. The amount of snow in winter and rain in summer is considerable.

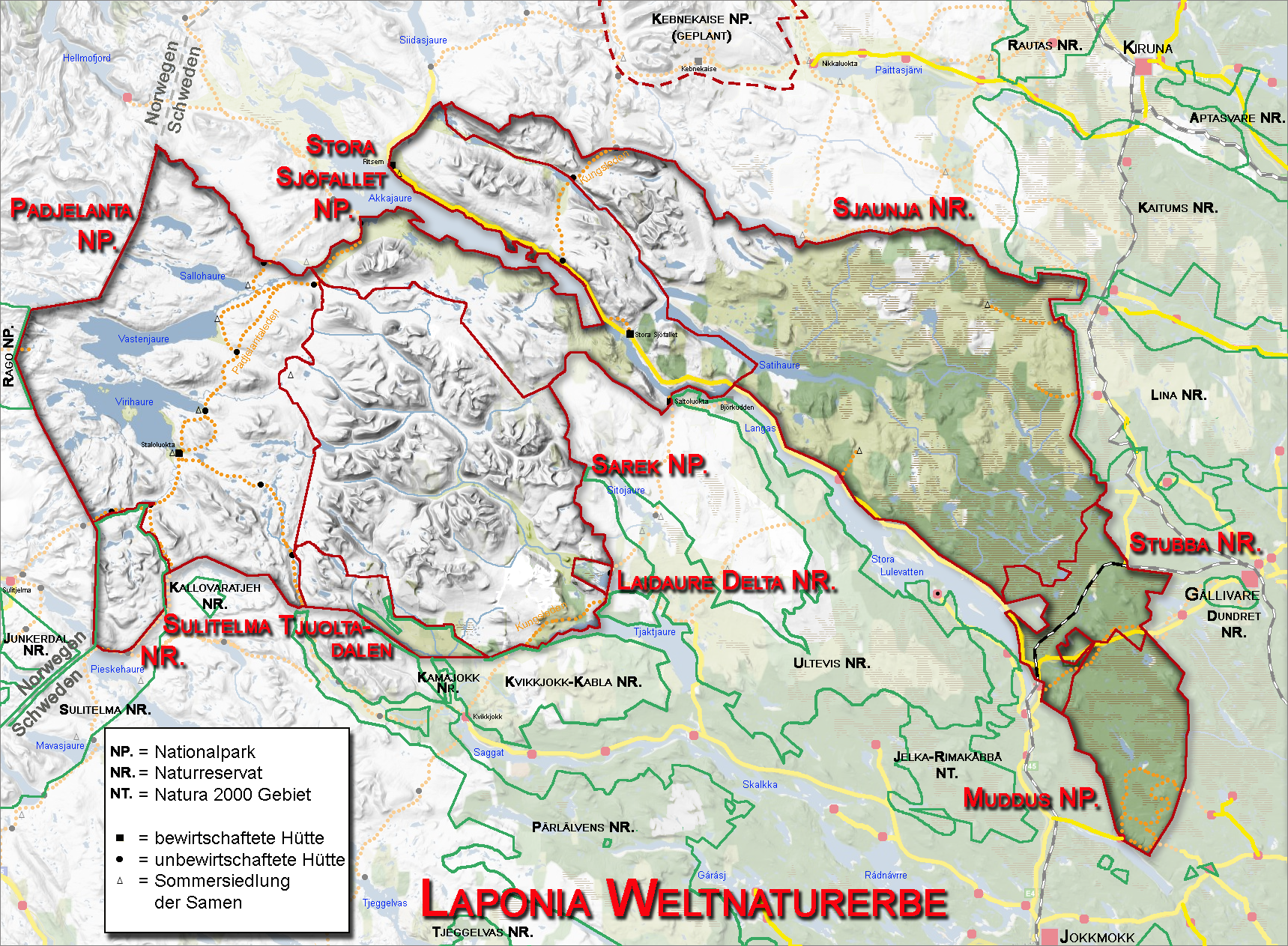
Overview of Laponia. From left to right: Padjelanta, Sarek, Stora Sjöfallet, Sjaunja, Stubba and Muddus.

95% of the area is protected as national parks or nature reserves. It consists of the national parks Muddus, Sarek, Padjelanta and Stora Sjöfallet, and the nature reserves Sjaunja and Stubba. The remaining 5% are located in the areas of Sulitelma, Tjuoltadalen, and Rapadalen (part of which is in the Sarek park).

The village of Porjus is a natural point of entry to the Laponian area and has recently opened an information center.

The Laponia area also contains three major hydropower stations with belonging basins and a big expansion of 100 wind power stations inside the world heritage area is planned.

The highest mountain of the area is Sarektjåhkkå, at 2,089 metres (6,854 ft).

== Gallery ==
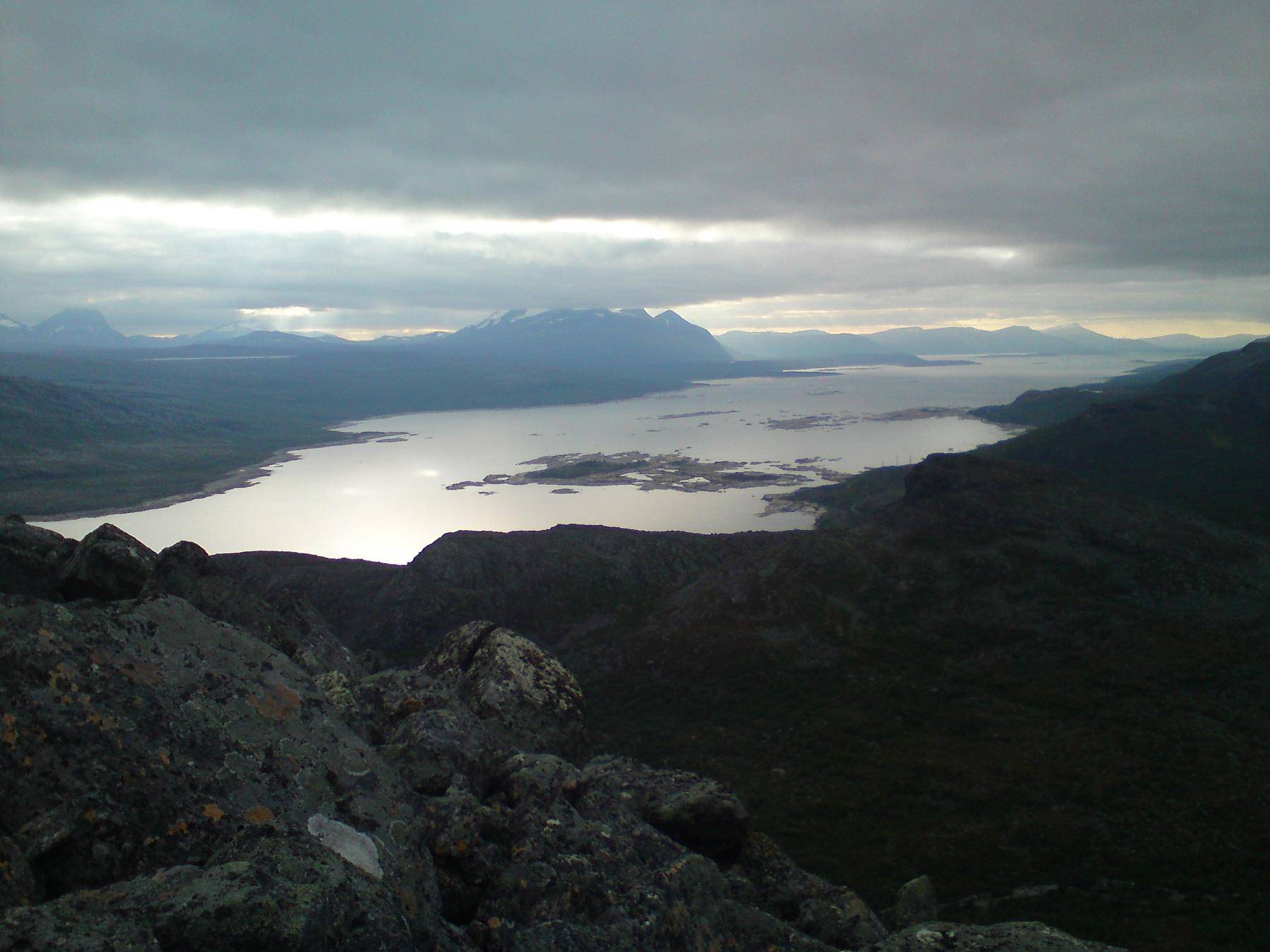
View from above, Laponia

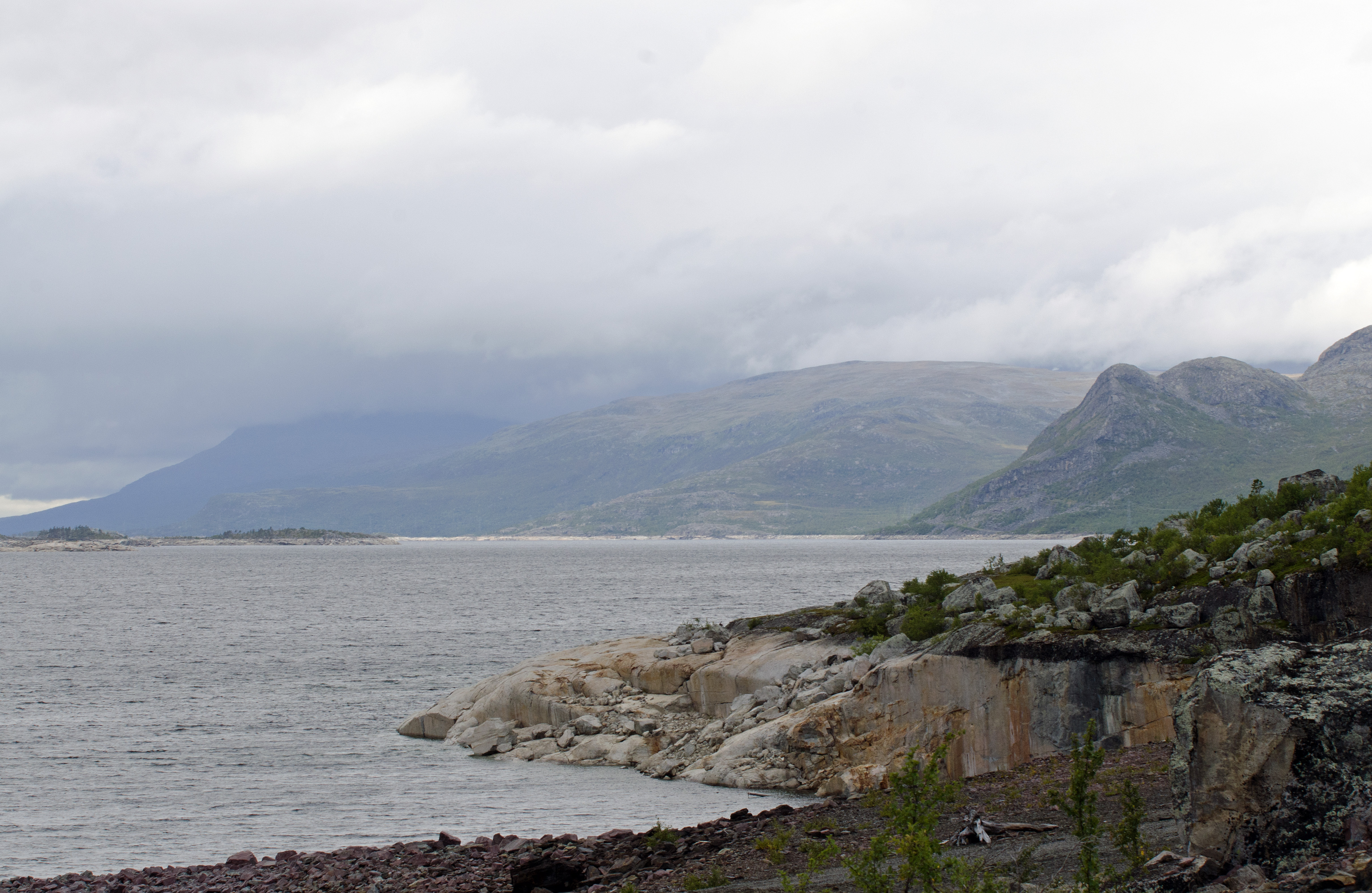
Panoramic view

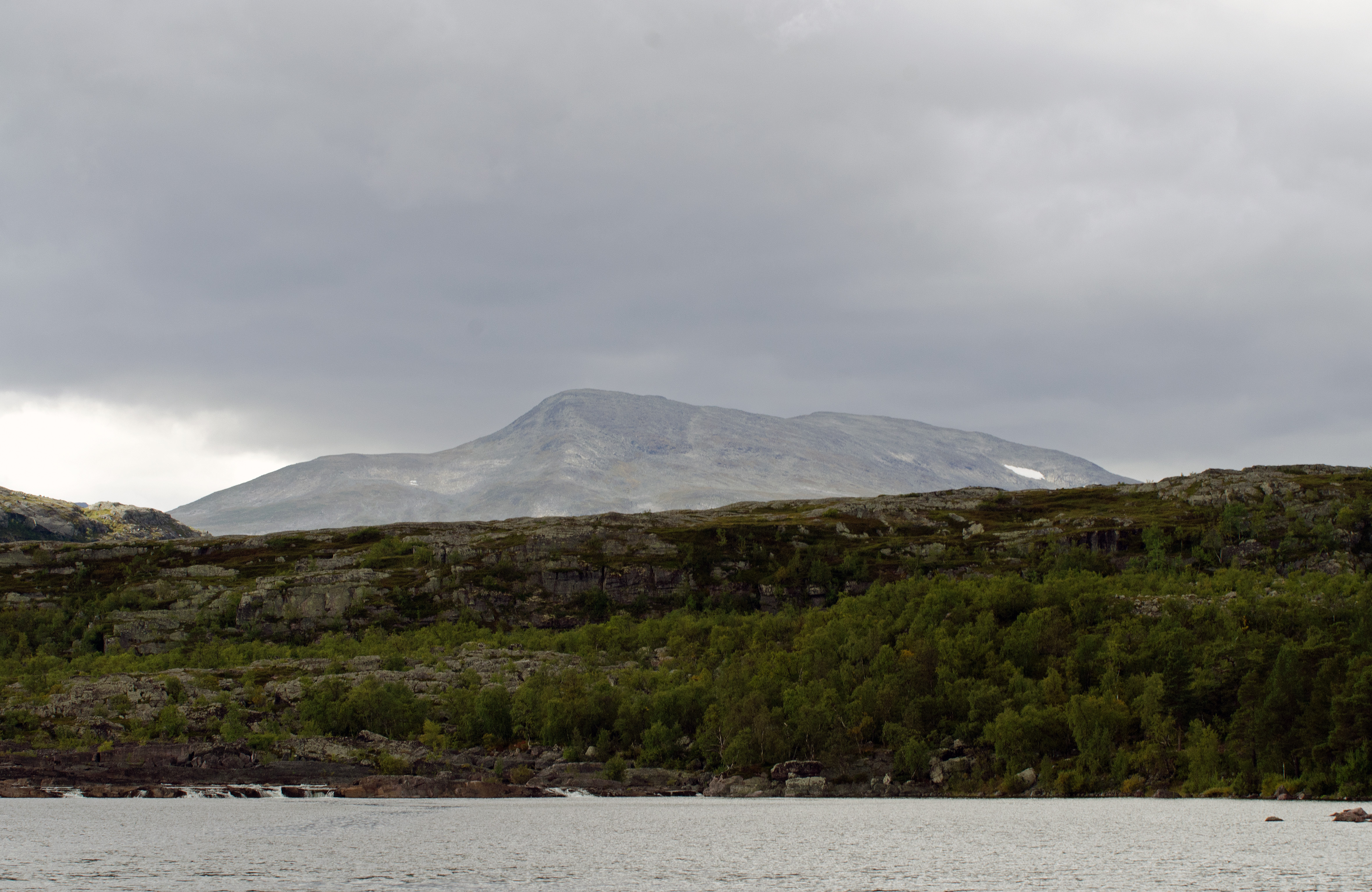
Panoramic view

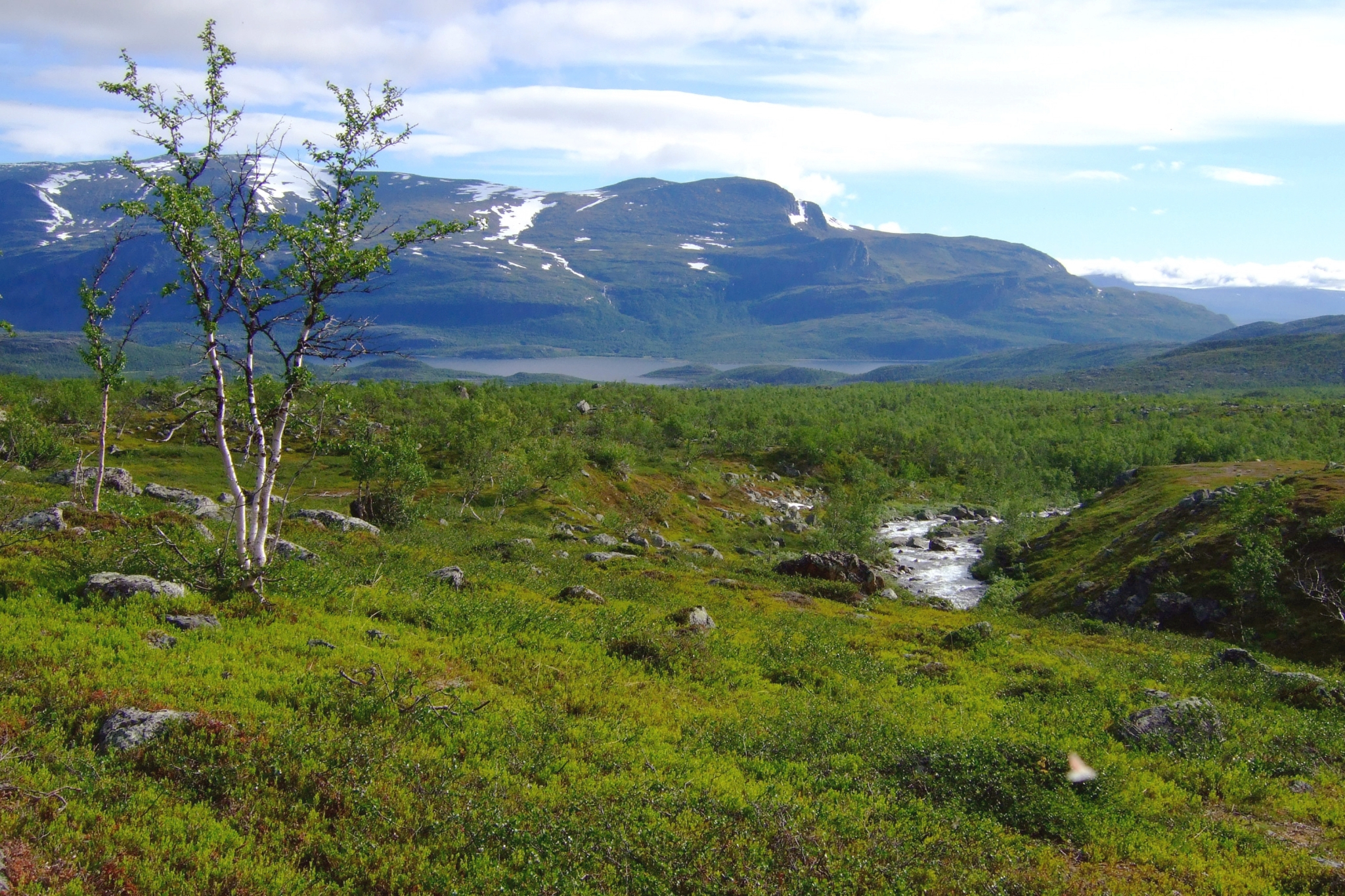
Lake Kårtejaure and the stream Njabbejåkkå, in Stora Sjöfallet National Park

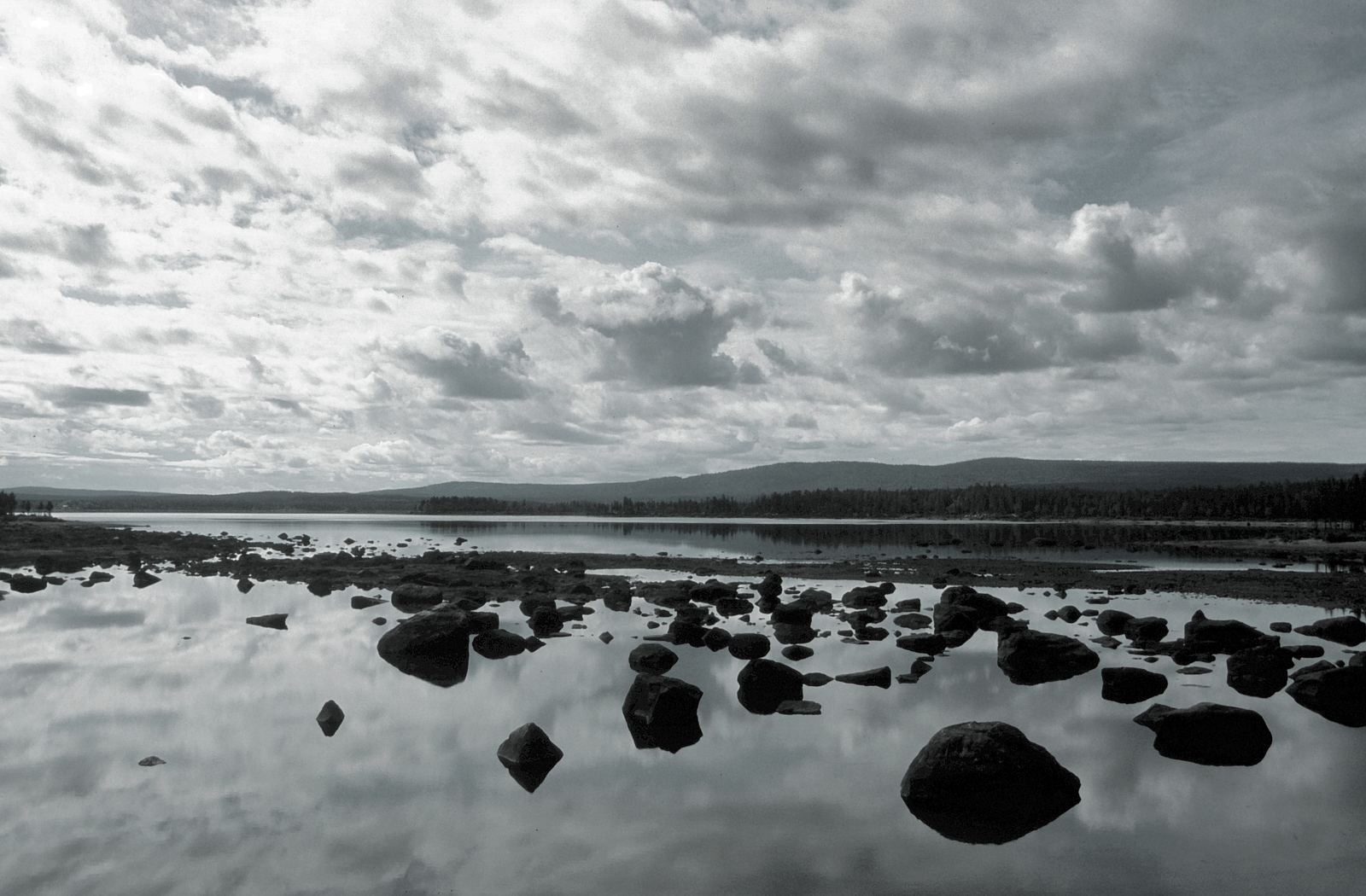
Landscape near Jokkmokk, Lappland

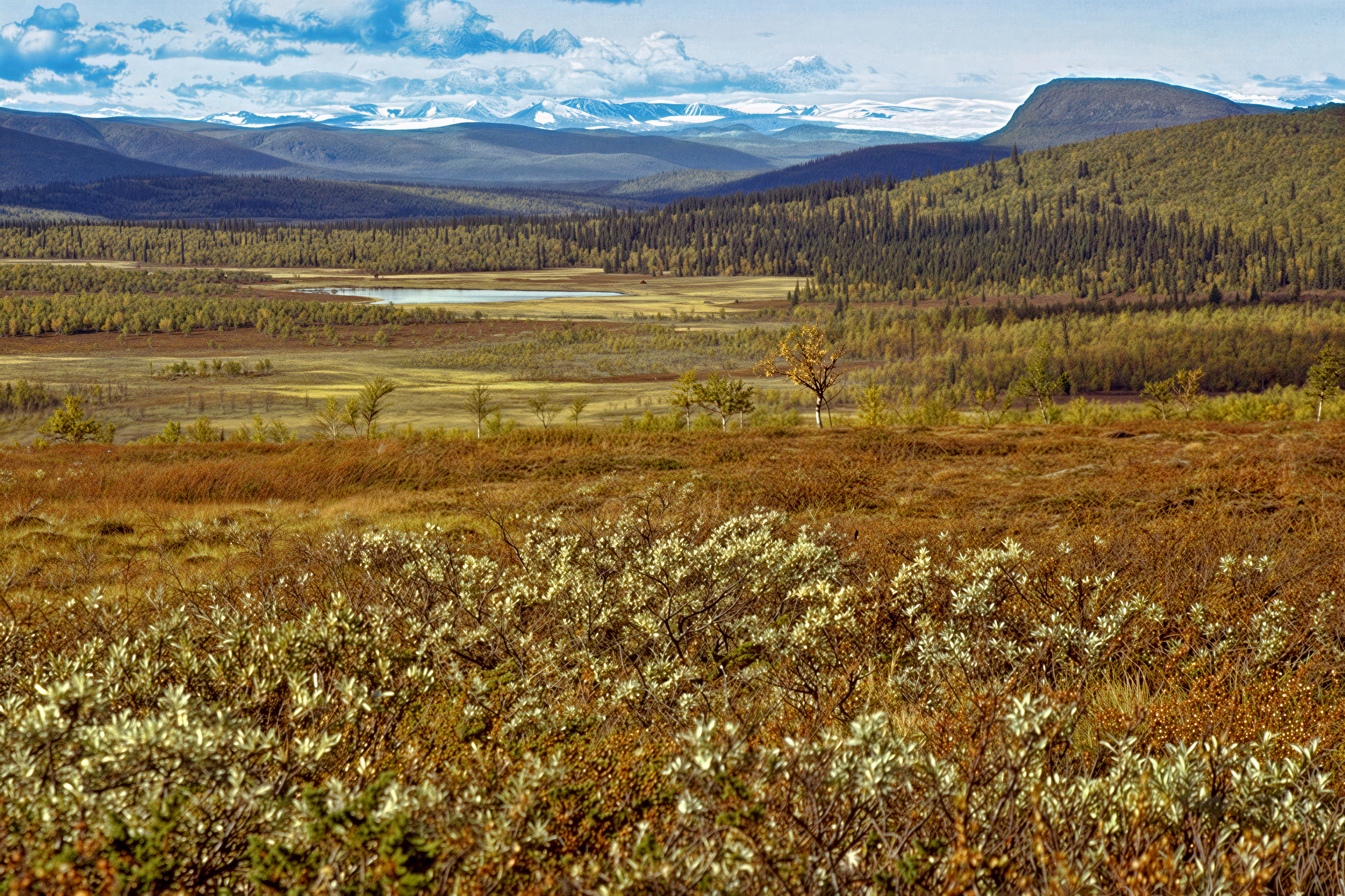
Sjaunja natural reserve

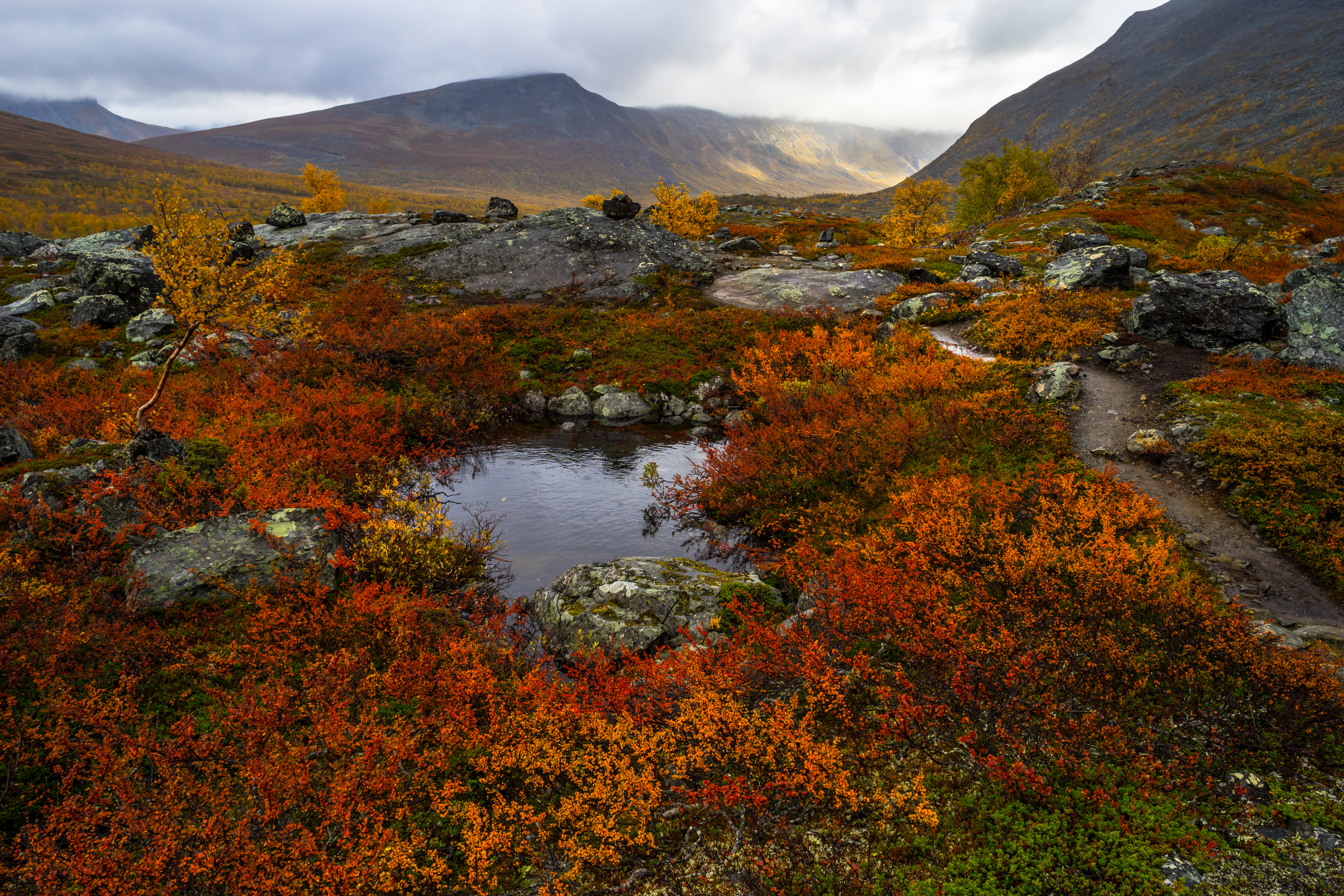
Mourki, Sjaunja natural reserve

== See also ==
- Lapland Biosphere Reserve
