= Udtja =

Sami reindeer herding camp in Sweden

Coordinates: 66°18′N 19°01′E

Udtja is a Sami reindeer herding camp in Jokkmokk Municipality, in the county of Norrbotten in Sweden.
