= Lagoona =

Dance and techno band

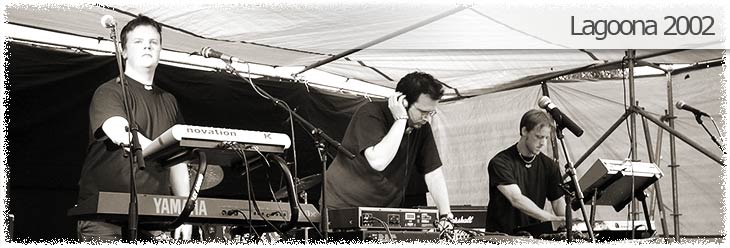

Background information
- Origin: Porjus; Sweden
- Genres: Dance; Trance; Eurodance; Techno
- Years active: 1996 – 2004
- Label: Independent
- Past members: Andreas Viklund; Björn Karlsson
- Website: lagoonamusic.com

Lagoona was a dance and techno band, consisting of the two music producers Andreas Viklund (born 1980) and Björn Karlsson (born 1976). The band was based in a small town called Porjus in northern Sweden. Lagoona was one of the first groups to call themselves "online artists" (October 1996) and they released their first free MP3 single on the Internet in October 1997, long before the format became widely popular.

== The early years ==
Lagoona first started making music in the tracker scene under the name TSEC (The Solid Energy Crew), and the band released its first two modules in October 1996. Their first releases got very popular on the internet, and being one of few artists to release legal MP3 songs in 1997 created a lot of attention for the band. In early 1998, their first album was released. It was named "Dreams" after their first online hit from 1996, and it was completely home-brew and released by the band's own label. The money from the album sales helped the band build a real studio, and in October 1998 when the band started using hardware synthesizers and MIDI equipment instead of tracker software, the band changed its name from TSEC to Lagoona.

Since then, Lagoona have peaked most major MP3 music charts on the net at some point. The band got two songs at the #1 spot of the MP3.com Music chart, "The Journey" in August 2000 and "Emotions in Trance" a couple of months later the same year. The band also had several other songs in high positions on the MP3.com Music chart, including "The Promised Land" at #2. In the MP3.com genre charts, all songs Lagoona released (over 40 tracks in total) reached a top-20 place at some point. Lagoona got more than 2.4 million song plays from MP3.com, and in total more than 8 million recorded downloads as of 2007 – a number which only a few bands in Sweden could match at the time. Lagoona also released their music on other sites, like Beatmaka.com, Weedshare.com and Javamusic.com, where they also reached the #1 spots, and they were ranked in the mp3charts.com "Global Top 100" for more than two years in a row.

== The later years ==
In 2001, Lagoona started working with vocals. The band recorded two songs with American-Dutch female singer Lizanne Hennessey ("Always in my heart" and "Be my friend"), and in 2003 the band co-operated with Swedish singer Åsa Holmberg who recorded one of Lagoonas most well-known songs, "Into my dream". Åsa also performed live with the band on stage during 2003 and 2004. Lagoona did over 30 live performances all over northern Sweden, playing as opening acts for Swedish artists like Markoolio and Da Buzz. They were assisted on stage by DJ Magho (2000–2002) and DJ Isecore (2002–2004). The band have also had a number of record contracts, but never released any commercial album or single of their own. Their first commercial release was a remix on the Eskimo single "Dreaming of me" (In.Disc/NorskeGram). Lagoona has also produced music for British/Australian popstar Gina G and released single tracks on several international compilation albums, with the last major release being "Cream of the clubs 2004" (ZYX/DanceStreet) and "A trip in Trance 3" (Blue Dot). In 2006, two years after the band was put to rest, British label RFU Recordingz released a vinyl single with a Happy Hardcore remix of "Into my dream".

Among their merits in the later years, their "Final destination" became the most downloaded song of 2003 at Beatmaka.com after staying several months on top of the charts. "Final destination" is also the only Lagoona song where both members are singing the vocals. At the same ranking for year 2004, Lagoona had three songs on the top-20 ("Into my dream" being the highest at #12). Lagoona also got #1 at the Weedshare top chart with "Into my dream".

In 2006. 6 songs "Always In My Heart", "Be My Friend", "Hands Up", "Into My Dream (Kaveh Azizi Remix)", "Land of Imagination", and "The Promised Land" by Lagoona were to be featured in Roxor Games's canceled Dance game "In The Groove 3", which then 2 songs "Be My Friend" and "Into My Dream (Kaveh Azizi Remix) were featured in Fun in Motion and Andamiro's Dance Game "Pump It Up PRO" in 2007. And as of 2020. "Into My Dream (Kaveh Azizi Remix)" is featured in Step Revolution's "StepManiaX" Dance Game.

== Today ==
Lagoona broke up with in 2004, and neither of the two members are currently active artists. The official website of Lagoona used to be found at lagoonamusic.com, but the site has been closed. Most songs can be found on various file-sharing networks and on sites like YouTube and Last.fm. Nearly all the songs can also be downloaded for free (under a Creative Commons Attribution license) from Andreas Viklund's artist page on SoundCloud.com, and streamed on Grooveshark.com.

In 2018 the domain of the original website was relaunched to commemorate the 20th anniversary since the band was born. This relaunch included a blog entry about the history of the band, the publication of the first four albums in digital streaming stores and the public release of a remix pack of acapellas and samples of various songs, via torrent. The website went offline again two years later.

In June 2021, after being announced in 2020, Lagoona publishes its fourth and last album (fifth including "Dreams" by The Solid Energy Crew as the first) called "Completion", which includes all those songs made by Lagoona from 2002 to 2004 that were not included in any album. This release did not mark the return of the band, but rather intended to bring all the songs together in a compilation so that they are easily found through digital platforms.

== Discography ==
=== Lagoona albums ===
- Dreams (1998, using the artist name "The Solid Energy Crew")
- Magic Melodies (2000)
- The Journey (2000)
- Generations (2002)
- Completion (2021)

An album called "Seventh heaven" was reportedly recorded in 2003–2004 with vocalist Åsa Holmberg, but it was never released.

=== Compilation and remix features ===
(this list is not complete, please help by adding releases you know of!)

- Tekno Magazine CD (1997, featuring a number of .XM modules by TSEC)
- Eskimo - Dreaming of me (1999, CD single featuring a Lagoona remix)
- Beatmaka Club Attack 2 (2001, featuring "Show me")
- Electronic Underground - best of MP3.com (2001)
- IncrediTrance #1 (2002, featuring "Hot for you")
- A Trip in Trance 2 (2002, featuring the TBO&Vega remix of "Show me")
- A Trip in Trance 3 (2003, featuring Kaveh Azizi's remix of "Into my dream")
- Cream of the Clubs 2004 (2004, featuring "The promised land")
- Into my dream (Frisky & Hujib remix) (2006, vinyl single released by RFU Recordingz)

Beside these releases, the two members have also made releases under their own name during the time of Lagoona. Andreas was a member of the Kosmic Free Music Foundation (KFMF), and has been featured on the Kosmic Archives album series and on the classic musicdisk "Return to stage 9". Both members have also released single songs on compilations for various labels under own artist names.
