= Puottaure =

Village in Norrbotten County, Sweden

Coordinates: 66°11′N 20°16′E

Puottaure is a small village in the southern part of Jokkmokk Municipality, Norrbotten County, Sweden. It had about 140 inhabitants in 1950 but has now only about 10. It has a small church. There is a bus to and from Harads.
