= Harsprånget hydroelectric power station =

Dam in Sweden

Harsprånget
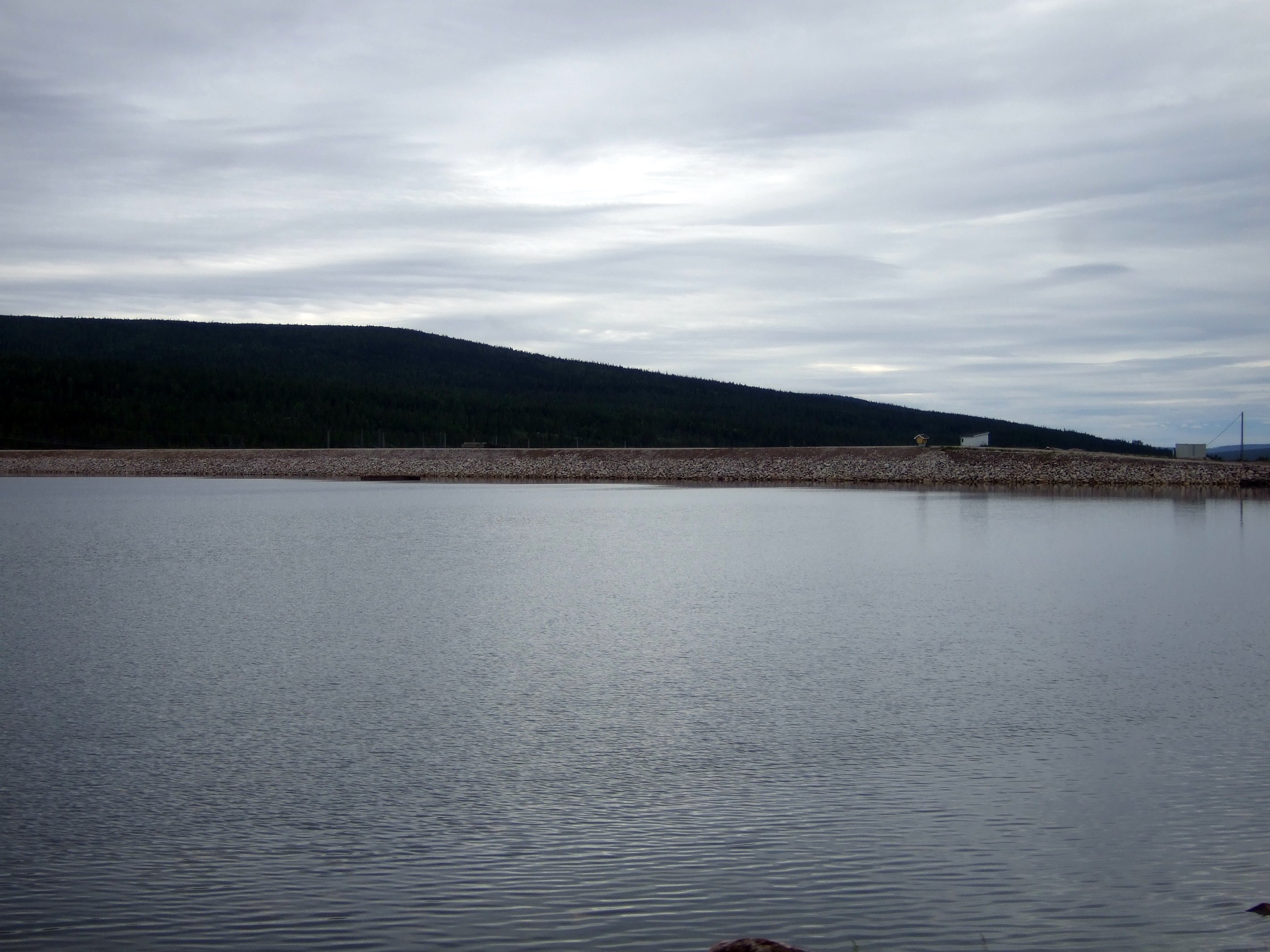

- Location within Sweden
- Country: Sweden
- Location: South of Porjus
- Coordinates: 66°53′04″N 19°49′27″E
- Status: Operational
- Construction began: 1918 Cancelled 1921; Restarted 1945
- Opening date: 1951
- Owner: Vattenfall

Dam and spillways
- Type of dam: Rock-fill dam
- Impounds: Lule River
- Height: 50 m (164 ft)
- Length: 1,400 m (4,600 ft)
- Dam volume: 6,000,000 m^{3} (210,000,000 ft^{3})

Reservoir
- Creates: Harsprånget Reservoir

Power Station
- Type: Conventional
- Hydraulic head: 107 m
- Turbines: 2*110 MW, 1*180 MW, 1*465 MW, 1* 110 MW idled. All of Francis-type
- Installed capacity: 811 MW
- Annual generation: 2,1 TWh (2009)

Harsprånget is a hydroelectric power station located on the Lule River in northern Sweden, just downstream of Porjus.

With a nameplate capacity of 811 MW, it is the largest hydroelectric power station in Sweden, and also among the largest in the Nordic countries. The name means "Hare Run" in Swedish. This was also the name of the now usually dry waterfall located downstream of the dam. Annual production is around 2131 GWh. Total hydraulic head is around 107 m.

== History ==
Construction of the station started in 1918. However, recession after World War I cancelled the construction, which was not started again before 1945. It was opened in 1951, then with a nameplate capacity of 330 MW. In 1980, two new units were installed, the latter of which, G5, was assigned a dedicated intake (located east of the pre-existing intake building, right next to the E45 road, which runs east and south of the plant area), a new dedicated underground powerhouse and a new outlet tunnel (which emerges just south of the pre-existing outlet tunnel on the left river bank, 3 kilometres south of the dam). This unit, also known as "Gerhard", is with a nameplate capacity of 475 MW almost as powerful as the other units combined, and is highly likely to be the single most powerful hydroelectric turbine in Europe, with larger single units in Russian plants located in the Siberian part of the country. The added units increased the nameplate capacity to 945 MW. The rated power was later increased further to 977 MW.

Unit 3 has since then been idled, but will be returned to service after an extensive refurbishment, including a turbine and generator replacement.

== Units ==
The turbines are of Francis type with vertical axis and steel spirals.
Units	1	2	3	4	5
Capacity	110 MW	110 MW	110 MW	180 MW	475 MW
Maximum water flow	127 m³/s	127 m³/s	127 m³/s	175 m³/s	485 m³/s
Revolutions/min	166,7 r/min	166,7 r/min	166,7 r/min	166,7 r/min	107,1 r/min
Cog diameter	3,6 m	3,6 m	3,6 m	4,2 m	6,6 m
Supplier	NOHAB	NOHAB	NOHAB	KMW	NOHAB
Status	Active	Active	Idled	Active	Active

== Waterfall ==
The power plant exploits roughly half of the hydraulic head on a roughly 20 km stretch of the Lule river between Porjus and the downstream Ligga power plant that not only differs significantly from the rest of the river system in terms of geology and topography, but has few if any equivalents within the rest of the country with comparable flow rate. On this river stretch, the river dropped a total of 215 meters (207 meters after interventions) in a large series of waterfalls confined in a v-shaped, partly canyon-like river valley, sometimes over 40 meters deep, whose banks almost unequivocally consist of exposed bedrock, unlike the rest of the river system where the river banks mostly are made up of moraine. At Harsprånget, the river becomes particularly narrow, sometimes just around 10 meters, and in its natural state, drops 75 meters over a distance of 3 km in what used to be a particularly violent series of waterfalls or rapids, characterized by two sharp turns, which are speculated to have given the former waterfall its name, as it would be likened to a fleeing hare. The maximum flow rate, according to the information sign at the location, was estimated at 1500 m^{3}/s during spring flood.

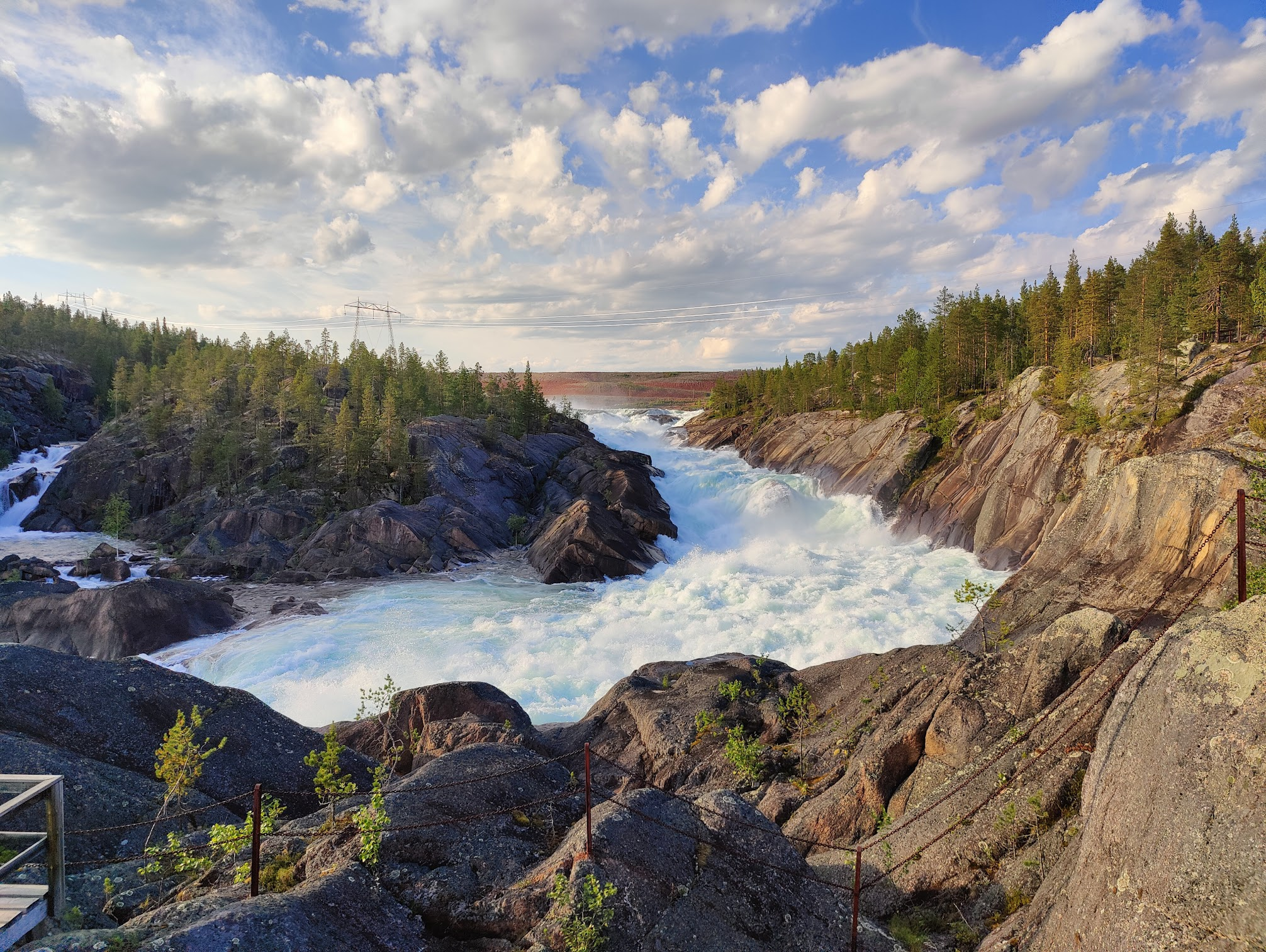
The normally dry waterfall downstream of the power plant, during a release of water from the dam.

The unusual river stretch and its waterfalls, including those at Porjus and Harsprånget, is believed to be geologically younger than the rest of the river system, and is thought to have been a result of the Lule river changing course after one, but not the most recent, ice age, before which it is believed to have flowed through the present Råne River valley. Through stream capture by the present right tributary Pakkojokk, which joins the Lule river just downstream of the Harsprånget canyon, the river carved its present course.
