= Karats =

- Location within Sweden
- Location: Norrbotten County, Lapland, Sweden
- Coordinates: 66°43′N 18°33′E
- Type: lake

Karats (Lule Sami: Gárásj) is a 60 square kilometres (23 sq mi) mountain lake in Norrbotten County, Lappland west of Jokkmokk that drains into Small Lule River by way of Pärl River.
