= Blackälven =

Location
- Country: Sweden
- County: Norrbotten
- Municipality: Jokkmokk

Physical characteristics
- Source: Tjaktjajávrre
  - coordinates: 66°58′40″N 18°35′00″E
- Mouth: Jiekkávrre
  - coordinates: 66°55′30″N 18°34′00″E
- Basin size: 2,460 km^{2} (950 sq mi)
- Discharge
  - average: 59 m^{3}/s (2,100 cu ft/s)

Blackälven is a river in Sweden.
