= Bodträskfors =

- Location within Norrbotten Location within Sweden
- Coordinates: 66°05′19″N 20°54′18″E
- Country: Sweden
- Province: Norrbotten
- County: Norrbotten County
- Municipality: Boden Municipality

Area
  - Total: 0.73 km^{2} (0.28 sq mi)

Population (2005-12-31)
  - Total: 205
  - Density: 280/km^{2} (730/sq mi)
- Time zone: UTC+1 (CET)
  - Summer (DST): UTC+2 (CEST)

Bodträskfors is a village situated in Boden Municipality, Norrbotten County, Sweden with 205 inhabitants in 2005.

It is situated by the river of Luleå, opposite Harads. The village became important because of the river of Bodträskfors, where among other things a mill was built. Today the impressive mansion is the only building left from "the good old days".

The Bodträskån River ends here.
