= Porjus Hydroelectric Power Station =

Power station in Sweden

Coordinates: 66°57′43″N 19°48′15″E

Porjus power station (Swedish: Porjus kraftverk) is one of the oldest and largest power plants in Sweden, situated near Porjus. It was built 1910-1915 and has a power of 480 MW. Besides three-phase AC, the plant originally also generated single phase 15 Hz AC for railway traction and hence, two single-phase 80 kV power lines ran along the Iron Ore Line Malmbanan where it was transformed down to 16 kV in substations. However this system was later abandoned in favor of rotary converter stations. The original machines for single phase AC were subsequently scrapped.

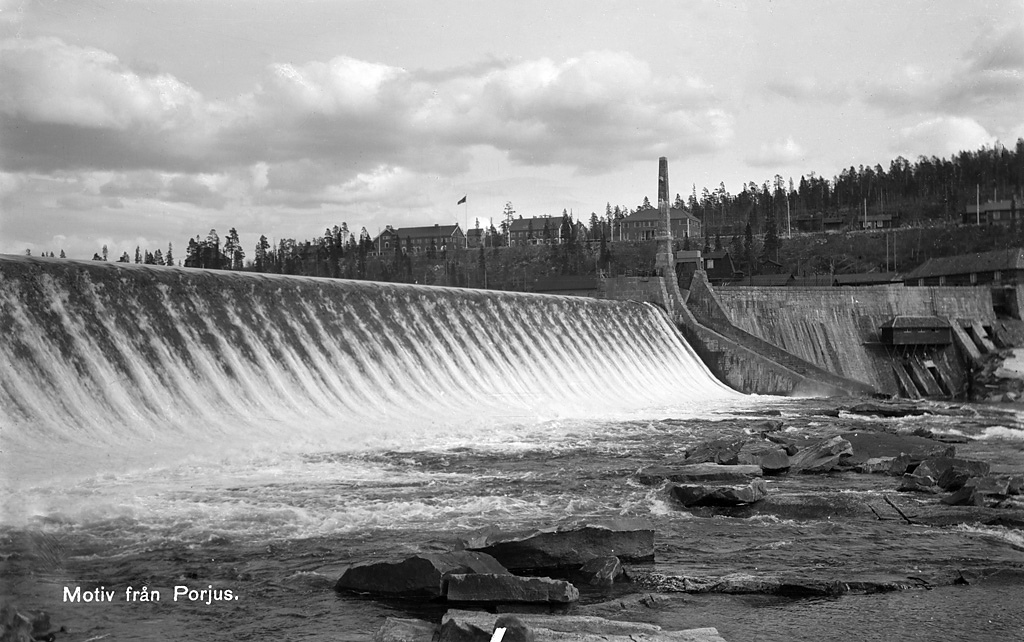
The dam, circa 1930-1949

The construction of the Porjus power station out in the wilderness is considered a pioneering achievement. The material for the founding work had to be carried in backpacks over a 44 km (27 mi) trail in uninhabited land before any infrastructure was built. In the early 1970s, a new power station was built but the old monumental brick building has been kept as a cultural heritage site with most of the machinery intact, with Vattenfall doing daily tours for visitors during the summertime. The station is actually the third largest. In 2016, its 10 MW generator was upgraded with a fast active magnetic bearing for testing.

Just downstream of the station is Harsprånget Hydroelectric power station.
