= Porjus =

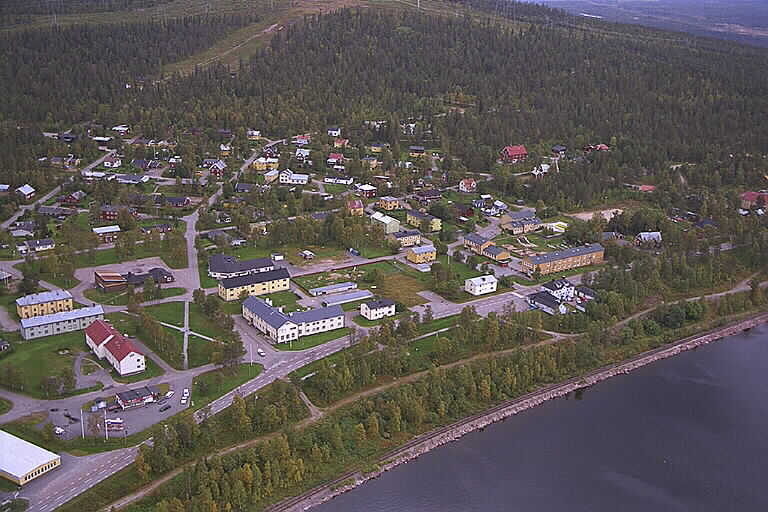

- Location within Norrbotten Location within Sweden
- Coordinates: 66°57′N 19°49′E
- Country: Sweden
- Province: Lapland
- County: Norrbotten County
- Municipality: Jokkmokk Municipality

Area
  - Total: 0.74 km^{2} (0.29 sq mi)

Population (31 December 2015)
  - Total: 343
  - Density: 324/km^{2} (840/sq mi)
- Time zone: UTC+1 (CET)
  - Summer (DST): UTC+2 (CEST)

Porjus (Meänkieli: Porjys) is a locality situated in Jokkmokk Municipality, Norrbotten County, Sweden with 328 inhabitants in 2010. Geographically it is situated by the shores of Lule River at 499 meter height.

Porjus is known for having one of the oldest hydropower plants in Sweden (Porjus kraftverk - Porjus hydroelectric power station), built 1910–1915. The power plant was built to deliver electricity to the building of the railroad between Luleå and Narvik, where the mining industry shipped iron ore.

Today, Porjus is a living village and the old power plant is a popular tourist attraction among many others. Swedish power company Vattenfall is the biggest employer, but there are also a number of smaller companies such as the small aviation company Fiskflyg, which offered the first regular passenger flights in Sweden back in the days (the route: Porjus - Suorva). There is also a unique golf course (you play across the Lule river, next to a big dam), a small downhill skiing course, snowmobile routes, small shops, a 50 kilometer long walking trail from Gällivare, used by the workers to carry building material 90 years ago, and a unique photo gallery which has aurora borealis as its specialty.

Porjus was the home of the online artists Lagoona between the years 1996–2004. Singer Birgitta Svendén and the former MD of major Swedish technology company Ericsson, Carl-Henric Svanberg, now chairman of Volvo and former chairman of BP, are two other well-known persons who were born in Porjus.

Porjus is also the last stop before you enter Laponia area, a UNESCO world heritage area which includes four national parks.

In October 1944, an Avro Lancaster bomber crash landed in nearby marshes after bombing the German battleship Tirpitz during Operation Obviate. After crash landing, the crew sold the fuel and set fire to Lancaster NF920 ("Easy Elsie"). They were unable to destroy the entire airplane so much of it still lies in the marshes of Sweden.
