= Jokkmokk Municipality =

Jokkmokk Municipality Jokkmokks kommun
- Municipality
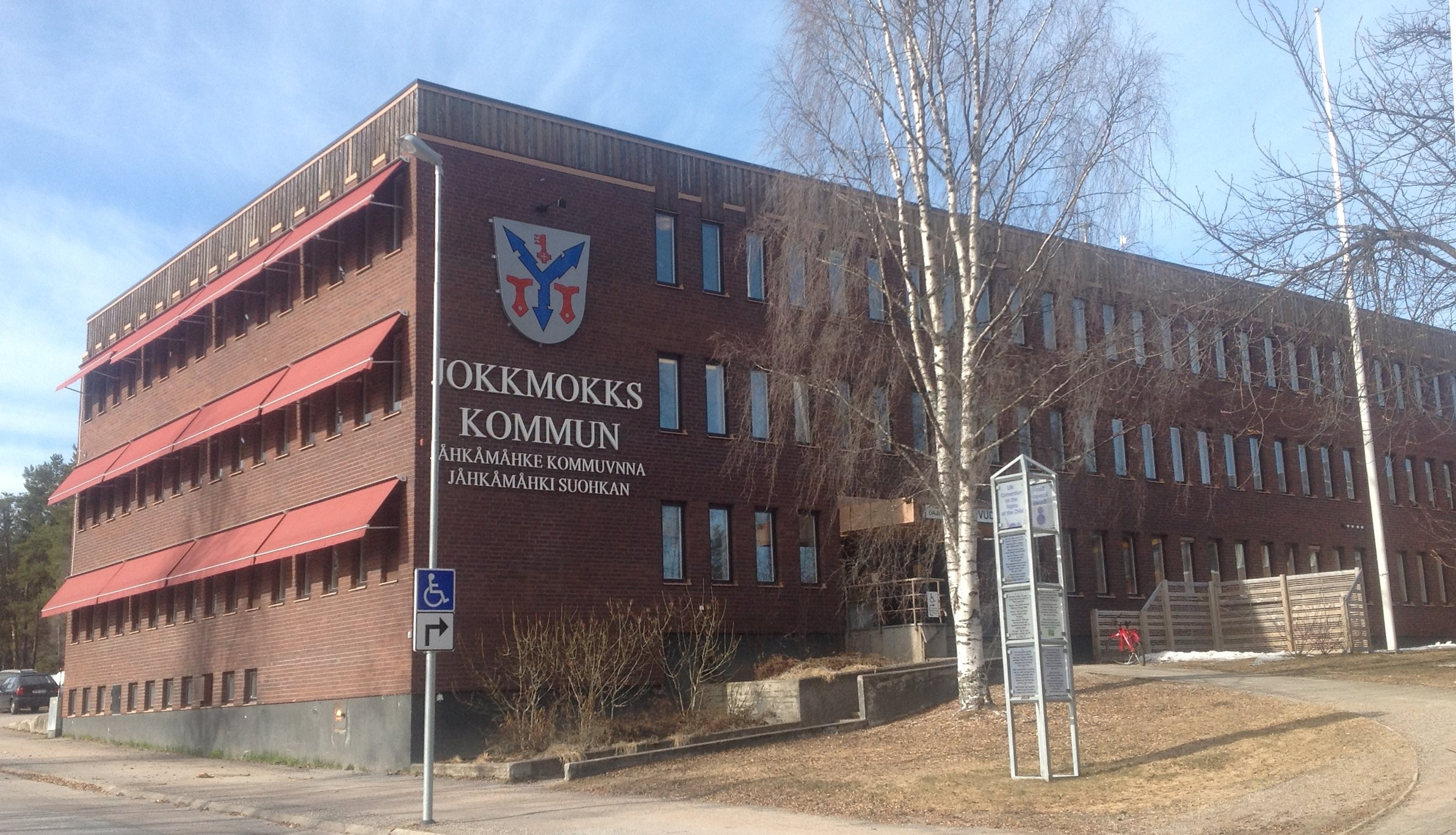
- Jokkmokk Municipal Building

- Coat of arms

- Coordinates: 66°37′N 19°50′E
- Country: Sweden
- County: Norrbotten County
- Seat: Jokkmokk

Area
  - Total: 19,334.44 km^{2} (7,465.07 sq mi)
  - Land: 17,614.32 km^{2} (6,800.93 sq mi)
  - Water: 1,720.12 km^{2} (664.14 sq mi)
- Area as of 1 January 2014.

Population (30 June 2025)
  - Total: 4,699
  - Density: 0.2668/km^{2} (0.6909/sq mi)
- Time zone: UTC+1 (CET)
  - Summer (DST): UTC+2 (CEST)
- International area code: +46
- ISO 3166 code: SE
- Province: Lapland
- Municipal code: 2510
- Website: www.jokkmokk.se

Jokkmokk Municipality (Swedish: Jokkmokks kommun, Finnish: Jokimukan kunta, Northern Sami: Johkamohkki gielda, Meänkieli: Jokinmukka) is a municipality in Norrbotten County in northern Sweden. Its seat is located in Jokkmokk.

The name Jokkmokk is Sami for the words "river" and "bend", since the town is situated close to a bend in the nearby river.

The municipality is the second largest in area of all Swedish municipalities and is, with an area of 19,477 km^{2} (approximately 7,520 square miles) slightly smaller than Slovenia or the US state of New Jersey. It has never been amalgamated with another entity, having been that large ever since municipalities were established in Sweden in 1863.

== History ==
The name Jokkmokk is present in the Jokkmokk Lapland Court District, a historical jurisdiction. When the municipality was given its current borders in 1971, its municipal coat of arms were made to depict the hydro plant, the symbol of Luleå (to which Jokkmokk belonged until 1673), and the traditional Sami hammers.

== Geography ==
The municipality is situated in the Scandinavian Mountains in Swedish Lapland and is sparsely populated. A large part of the area has been the habitat of reindeer herding Sami people for thousands of years and has for that reason been protected as a UNESCO World Heritage Site under the name Laponian area. The Laponian area is roughly divided into the eastern flatlands and the western mountainous region. There are several well-structured and well-maintained starting locations for those interested in experiencing the majestic wilderness. For instance, the Kvikkjokk basecamp provides excursions and has a high quality hostel.

Due to the northern location, the aurora borealis can be experienced all through winter (November to March), and the midnight sun can be experienced during June and July.

The Lule River and the Lesser Lule River flows through the district. The rivers are heavily regulated for hydroelectricity, most of all in Sweden. 6 of the 10 largest hydroelectric plants are located in the area. This includes the 977 MW Harsprånget, the 480 MW Porjus, and the 460 MW Messaure. There's a total of 11 hydroelectric plants in the area, 9 over 100 MW, 8 over 200 MW, and 4 over 400 MW.

=== Localities ===
There are three official localities (or urban areas) in Jokkmokk Municipality. The municipal seat is bolded:

#	Locality	Population
1	**Jokkmokk**	2,976
2	Vuollerim	800
3	Porjus	317

Additional small settlements within the municipality include the Sami reindeer herding camp Udtja and the village of Puottaure.

== Demographics ==
This is a demographic table based on Jokkmokk Municipality's electoral districts in the 2022 Swedish general election sourced from SVT's election platform, in turn taken from SCB official statistics.

In total there were 4,769 residents, including 3,773 Swedish citizens of voting age. 59.6% voted for the left coalition and 38.9% for the right coalition. Indicators are in percentage points except population totals and income.

Location	Residents	Citizen adults	Left vote	Right vote	Employed	Swedish parents	Foreign heritage	Income SEK	Degree
Location			%	%					
Jokkmokk V	1,619	1,308	58.6	40.0	85	90	10	23,392	33
Jokkmokk Ö	1,890	1,446	61.3	37.7	84	84	16	24,914	34
Porjus	360	287	51.9	45.8	85	84	16	23,433	26
Vuollerim	900	732	61.6	36.3	80	85	15	21,526	27
Source: SVT

== Attractions ==
=== National parks ===
The four national parks in Jokkmokk Municipality all have their own distinct identity. The national parks are Sarek, Muddus, Padjelanta and Stora Sjöfallet.

These national parks are popular with tourists all year around but the darkest and coldest months (November to January) are not recommended for beginners. The best period for sunshine and winter activities is from February all through April, when the snow lies deep and the days are long. This time of year the national parks are easily accessible by snowmobile and skis. Visitors should understand and respect that the wilderness is just that, and snowmobiles are not allowed in the parks at any time.

The summer in Jokkmokk Municipality is short but intense. The ground is free of snow from May until late October, early November. As with most areas in the Nordic countries, the actual warm period is quite short, but as Jokkmokk Municipality has a continental climate, the temperature can top 30 degrees Celsius in the summer and reach as low as -40 degrees Celsius in the winter. During the summer months hikers and other friends of nature converge in the national parks and this is also the time when most of the parks are most easily accessed. Visitors should be warned that the amount of mosquitoes can be difficult to those not used to them and driving has an added danger in the reindeer that seek shelter from the mosquitoes. Collisions with reindeer are frequent in most of the northern parts of the Nordic countries and drivers should keep an eye out.

=== Other attractions ===
Jokkmokk's famous winter market

Jokkmokk is known for its Sami market held the first weekend every February. This market has been held for more than 400 consecutive years. Initially a gathering of traders from the entire region the market has long since grown to be more than a simple gathering of traders and is now a week-long cultural event with lectures, art exhibitions, concerts and much more.

== Mining ==
There are iron ore deposits in the region, and the proposed Kallak mine, which has been met with resistance by activists, lies within the municipality. Mining exploration by British company Beowulf Mining has identified a potential mining site between the (non-Sami) villages of Björkholmen and Randijaur, which forms part of the reindeer winter grazing lands of the Sami community of Jåhkågasska tjiellde.

== Elections ==
=== Riksdag ===
These are the results of the elections to the Riksdag since the 1972 municipal reform. Norrbotten Party also contested the 1994 election but due to the party's small size at a nationwide level SCB did not publish the party's results at a municipal level. The same applies to the Sweden Democrats between 1988 and 1998. "Turnout" denotes the percentage of eligible voters casting any ballots, whereas "Votes" denotes the number of actual valid ballots cast.

Year	Turnout	Votes	V	S	MP	C	L	KD	M	SD	ND	NP/SP
1973	84.1	4,684	17.7	54.0	0.0	14.5	5.7	1.5	6.3	0.0	0.0	0.0
1976	85.0	4,831	13.1	56.5	0.0	14.7	6.7	1.1	7.2	0.0	0.0	0.0
1979	84.6	4,688	11.4	58.2	0.0	11.0	6.0	0.9	9.2	0.0	0.0	0.0
1982	84.3	4,585	10.2	61.6	2.4	8.7	3.3	1.1	11.9	0.0	0.0	0.0
1985	82.6	4,460	9.6	61.8	2.3	6.4	9.0	0.0	10.8	0.0	0.0	0.0
1988	78.9	4,192	10.7	59.3	6.0	5.3	9.1	1.8	7.4	0.0	0.0	0.0
1991	82.0	4,214	10.6	54.1	3.6	4.5	7.7	3.7	12.1	0.0	3.6	0.0
1994	84.5	4,235	11.5	64.0	6.0	3.3	4.0	1.5	7.9	0.0	0.4	0.0
1998	81.1	3,906	27.9	46.3	4.6	2.3	3.1	5.8	9.1	0.0	0.0	0.0
2002	78.7	3,544	13.5	45.3	8.6	3.2	5.4	3.7	4.0	0.0	0.0	15.6
2006	79.3	3,425	14.7	47.8	6.5	5.6	5.8	2.3	10.8	1.0	0.0	2.1
2010	81.1	3,351	10.4	52.6	7.7	3.8	5.0	1.9	13.6	3.7	0.0	0.0
2014	81.7	3,296	9.7	48.5	9.5	2.4	3.2	1.3	9.1	12.8	0.0	0.0

Blocs

This lists the relative strength of the socialist and centre-right blocs since 1973, but parties not elected to the Riksdag are inserted as "other", including the Sweden Democrats results from 1988 to 2006, but also the Christian Democrats pre-1991 and the Greens in 1982, 1985 and 1991. The sources are identical to the table above. The coalition or government mandate marked in bold formed the government after the election. New Democracy got elected in 1991 but are still listed as "other" due to the short lifespan of the party.

Year	Turnout	Votes	Left	Right	SD	Other	Elected
1973	84.1	4,684	**71.7**	26.5	0.0	1.8	98.2
1976	85.0	4,831	69.6	**28.6**	0.0	1.8	98.2
1979	84.6	4,688	69.6	**26.2**	0.0	4.2	95.8
1982	84.3	4,585	**71.8**	23.9	0.0	4.3	95.7
1985	82.6	4,460	**71.4**	26.2	0.0	2.4	97.6
1988	78.9	4,192	**76.0**	21.8	0.0	2.2	97.8
1991	82.0	4,214	64.7	**28.0**	0.0	7.3	96.3
1994	84.5	4,235	**81.5**	16.7	0.0	1.8	98.2
1998	81.1	3,906	**78.8**	20.3	0.0	0.9	99.1
2002	78.7	3,544	**67.4**	16.3	0.0	16.3	83.7
2006	79.3	3,425	69.0	**24.5**	0.0	6.5	93.5
2010	81.1	3,351	70.7	**24.3**	3.7	1.3	98.7
2014	81.7	3,296	**67.7**	16.0	12.8	3.5	96.5
