= Råne River =

Råne River Radnejokk
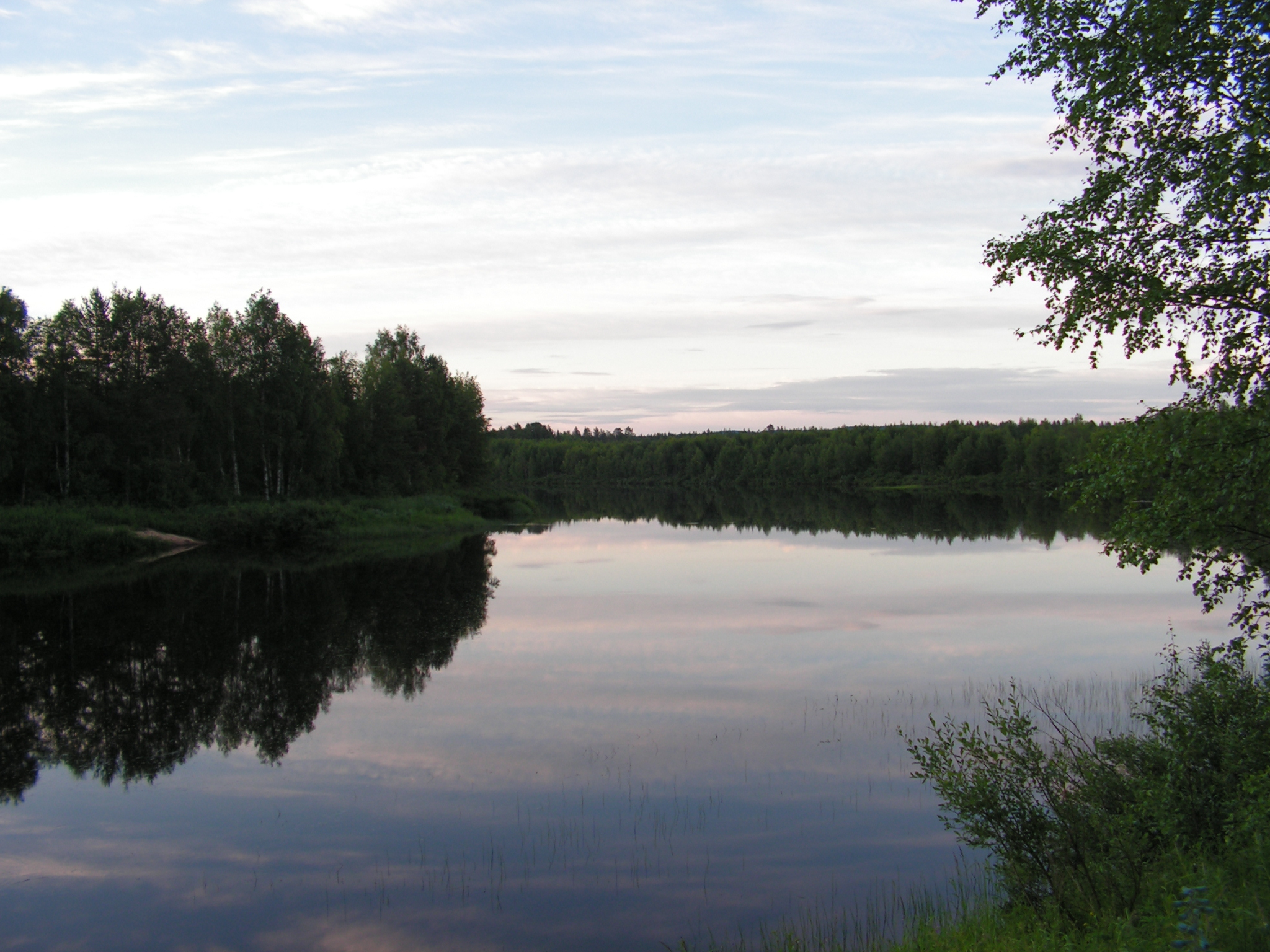
- Native name: Råneälven (Swedish)

Location
- Country: Sweden
- County: Norrbotten

Physical characteristics
- Source: Radnejaure (Råne träsk)
- Mouth: Rånefjärden, Bothnian Bay
  - location: Råneå
  - coordinates: 65°49′45″N 22°21′00″E
  - elevation: 0 m (0 ft)
- Length: 210 km (130 mi)
- Basin size: 4,207.3 km^{2} (1,624.4 sq mi)
- Discharge
  - average: 43 m^{3}/s (1,500 cu ft/s)

Råne River (Swedish: Råneälven) is a river in Sweden.
