= Muddus National Park =

National park in Sweden

- Muddus nationalpark; Muttos suoddjimpárkka
- IUCN category II (national park)
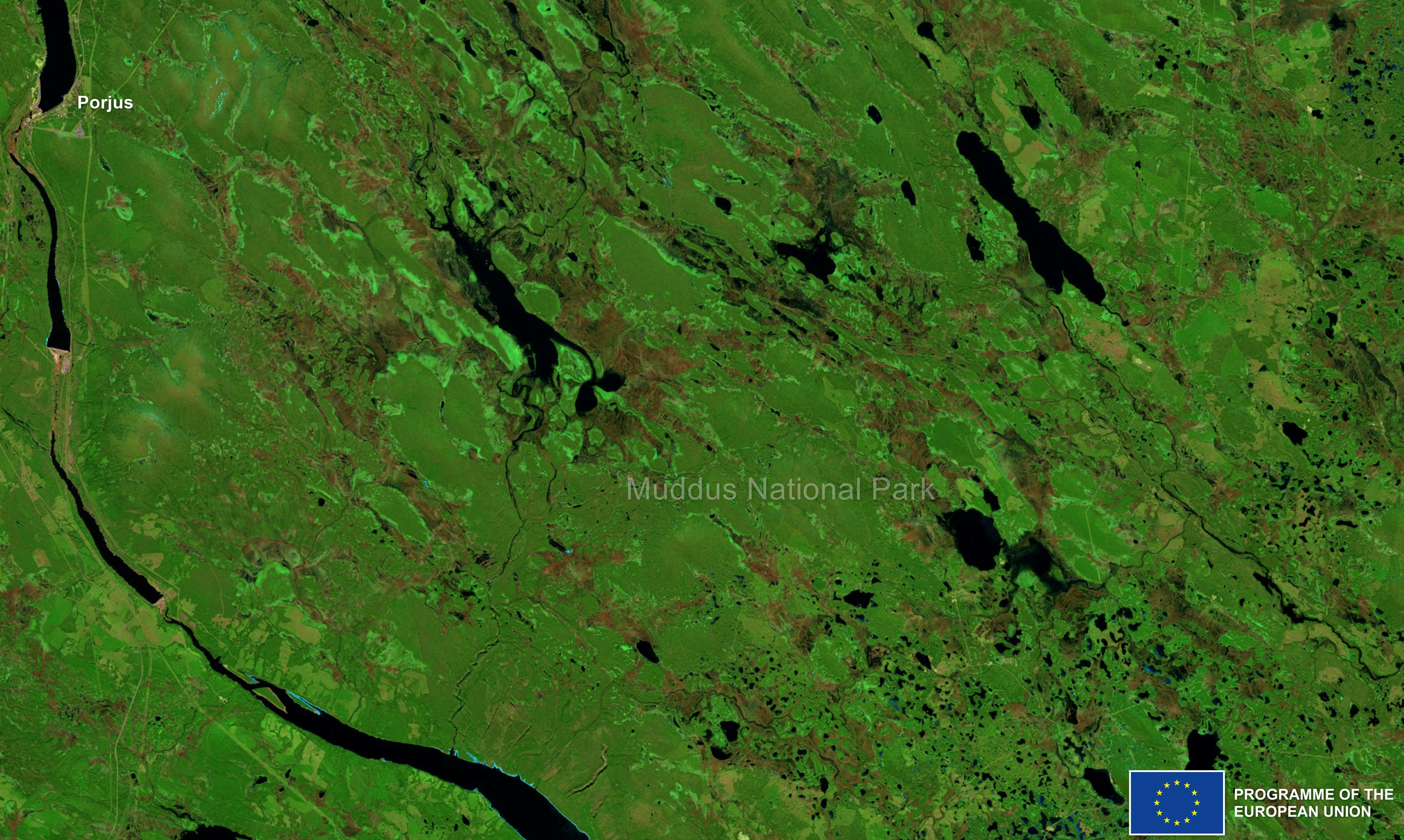
- A satellite image of the park.
- Interactive map of Muddus National Park
- Location: Norrbotten County, Sweden
- Nearest city: Gällivare and Jokkmokk
- Coordinates: 66°54′N 20°10′E
- Area: 493.4 km^{2} (190.5 sq mi)
- Established: 1942, extended 1948
- Governing body: Naturvårdsverket

Muddus (Swedish: [ˈmɵ̌dːɵs]; Lule Sami: Muttos) is a national park in northern Sweden. It is situated in the province Lapland, with its largest part in the Gällivare Municipality. Furthermore, it belongs to the largely untouched UNESCO World Heritage classified Laponian area.

Natural scenes include the old-growth forest with large trees, large boggy grounds, and deep ravines in between the rocks. Sweden's oldest known pine tree is also located here. It has been estimated to be at least 710 years old, as it was found to have withstood a forest fire in 1413.

== Wildfires ==
Forest fires in Muddus National Park have left traces on sample plots. There are fire scars on living or dead trees or charcoal fragments in the humus layer. The park was investigated on 75 separate sample plots. Some of the major fire years in the Muddus area coincide with forest fires in other parts of northern Sweden, in the taiga of western Russia, and in central Siberia. There is constant regeneration happening in the wildlife in the National Park. Forest fires were shown to have occurred in the five different types of forest. The fires that were most frequently occurring of fires in the pine forests occurred with within the span of 81–90 years, while the mean frequency was 110 years. The interval of time elapsed since the last forest fire occurred in the pine forests was 144 years. Some of the major fire years in the Muddus area coincide with forest fires in other parts of northern Sweden, in the taiga of western Russia, and in central Siberia.

== Mires ==
In 1940 a range of mires were found in the Muddus National Park. The park also went under investigation for its mires and wetlands. The mires consisted from ombrotrophic bogs to rich fens. They are found to be very rich in bryophytes. There are 66 species and you can find them in dry habitats as well.

== Geography ==
It is known for its waterfalls, deep ravines, low mountain and forest where the trees have seen many generations of people pass by.

== Wildlife ==
=== Birds ===
Due to a large-scale forestry landscape structure; the structure and composition of boreal bird communities are in North Sweden. Birds control the effects of patch size, forest age and tree species compositions. The most common birds that live in the park are Capercaillie. These birds are black grouse and hazel hen. They are constantly being reproduced in the forest year-round. The second most common bird that is found here is the Siberian jay and Siberian tit. These birds are intensely present mostly during the summer time. Other animals that reside in the park are whooper swans, bean geese and black-throated loons appear on the lakes. Located at the marshes of the park, cranes, sandpipers and snipes are present

=== Deer ===
Reindeer are in the Muddus National park are present in the area year-around. Although rare, there are also brown bears, lynx and wolverines in the park. It is common, to encounter reindeer, elk or some of the forests’ and marshes’ many birds.

=== Flora ===
The Muddus National Park trees show how large non-systematic variations are there. This is due to climatic changes because of industrialization in Sweden through the years.

There are an abundance of spiders that have been found in the Muddus National Park. In particular, There has been four species of different genital characters of spiders have been found. This is due to the abundance of spruce, pine forest, and shallow lakes in the northern taiga zone. There was 157 spiders collected from the southern park of the park.

National parks of Sweden (clickable map)

== See also ==
- Muddus plains
