= Jokkmokk =

Jokkmokk Jåhkåmåhkke (Lule Sami) Dálvvadis (Northern Sami) Jokimukka (Finnish) Jokinmukka, Jokmokki (Meänkieli)
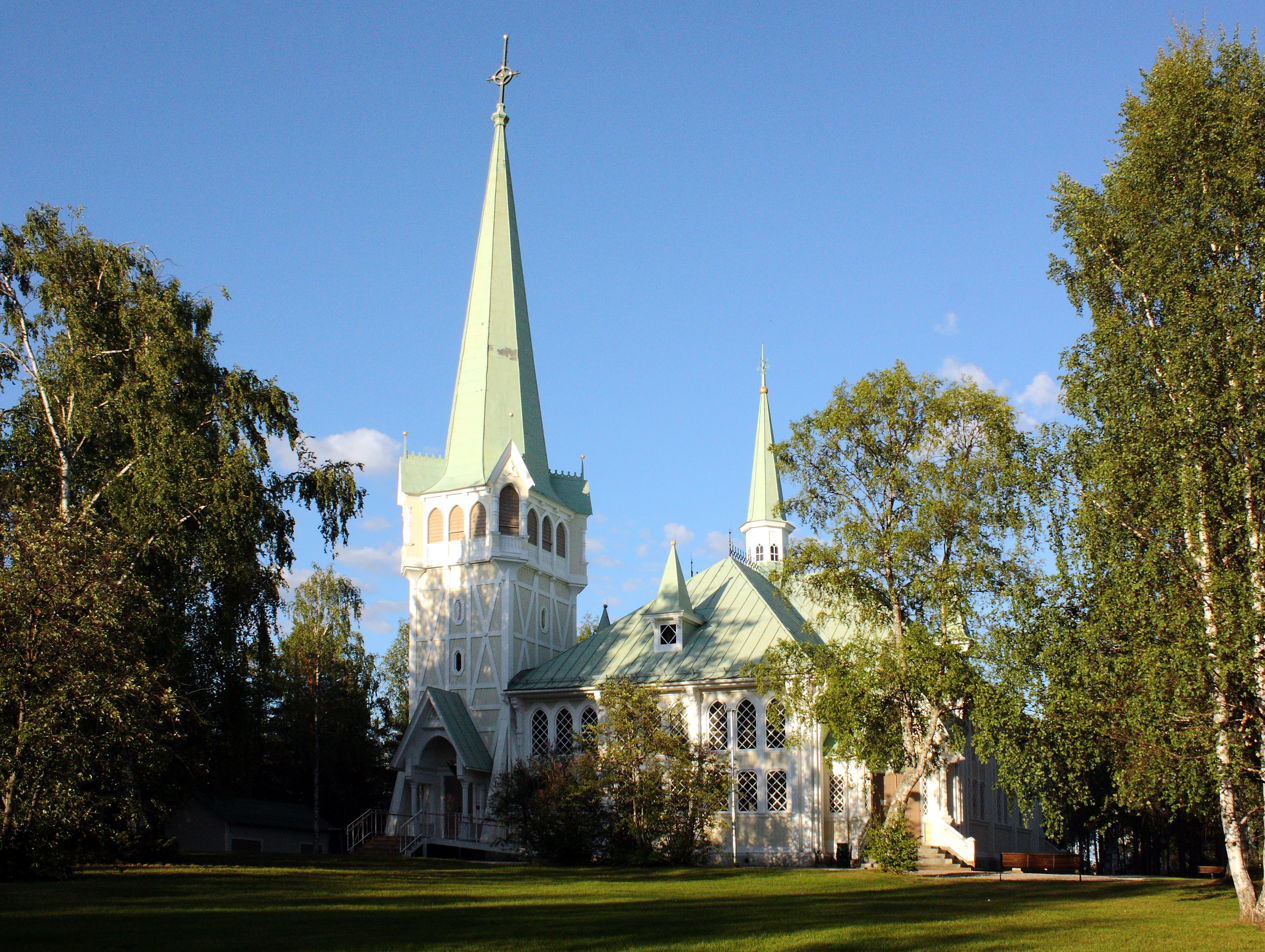
- Jokkmokk Church

- Location within Norrbotten Location within Sweden
- Coordinates: 66°37′N 19°50′E
- Country: Sweden
- Province: Lapland
- County: Norrbotten County
- Municipality: Jokkmokk Municipality

Area
  - Total: 3.59 km^{2} (1.39 sq mi)

Population (31 December 2010)
  - Total: 2,786
  - Density: 776/km^{2} (2,010/sq mi)
- Time zone: UTC+1 (CET)
  - Summer (DST): UTC+2 (CEST)

Jokkmokk (Swedish: [ˈjɔ̌kːmɔk]) is a locality and the seat of Jokkmokk Municipality in Norrbotten County, province of Lapland, Sweden, with 2,786 inhabitants in 2010. The Lule Sámi name of the place (composed of the individual words jåhkå and måhkke) means "River's Curve," due to the meandering river that runs through it. As in other towns in Lapland, the Swedish language is dominant at an official level in Jokkmokk in modern times. The settlement is just north of the Arctic Circle. Talvatissjön is located at the southern part of Jokkmokk.

Jokkmokk is an important locality for the Sámi people and the location of several institutions related to them, including an education centre, the Ájtte museum, and an office of the Sámi Parliament of Sweden.

Jokkmokk was a transit center for Sámi refugees from Norway during World War II, in addition to the centre in Kjesäter.

Jokkmokk Market has been taking place since 1605. On the first Thursday in February every year, thousands of people gather in the town for concerts, exhibitions and trade in one of the most important social events for the Sámi people in Sápmi. Temperatures during the festival can drop as low as −40 °C (−40 °F).

== Climate ==
Influenced by its inland and northerly position, Jokkmokk's variety of a subarctic climate (Dfc) is very cold by Swedish standards. Summers are normally relatively mild, with midnight sun, and the dark winters are long and cold, although polar night is not quite observed with a sun angle of 0.4° at the winter solstice. Combining an elevation of 250 metres (820 ft) with being at the foot of the Scandinavian Mountains, Jokkmokk is both cooled down during the day and experiences temperature inversion during night. This combination makes it the coldest municipal seat in Sweden in terms of winter temperatures, although some rural localities in Lapland are even colder.

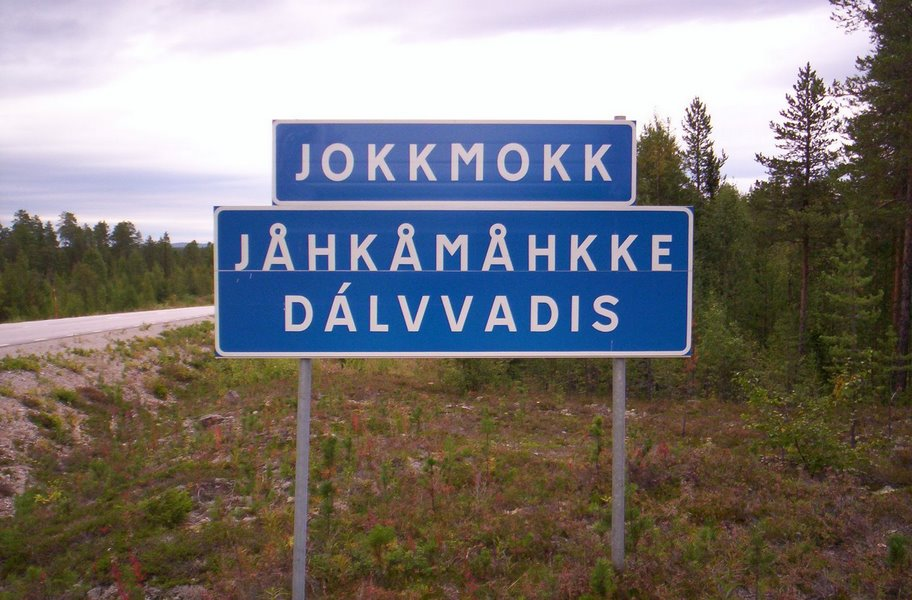
A trilingual road sign in Jokkmokk. From top to bottom: Swedish, Lule Sámi, and Northern Sámi

Climate data for Jokkmokk (2002–2021 averages, extremes since 1901)
Month	Jan	Feb	Mar	Apr	May	Jun	Jul	Aug	Sep	Oct	Nov	Dec	Year
Record high °C (°F)	9.2 (48.6)	9.7 (49.5)	12.3 (54.1)	19.2 (66.6)	28.5 (83.3)	31.2 (88.2)	34.5 (94.1)	30.5 (86.9)	23.4 (74.1)	18.5 (65.3)	10.8 (51.4)	8.0 (46.4)	34.5 (94.1)
Mean maximum °C (°F)	2.6 (36.7)	4.6 (40.3)	7.6 (45.7)	13.7 (56.7)	22.7 (72.9)	26.2 (79.2)	27.1 (80.8)	25.0 (77.0)	19.1 (66.4)	11.9 (53.4)	5.2 (41.4)	4.2 (39.6)	28.4 (83.1)
Mean daily maximum °C (°F)	−9.4 (15.1)	−7.0 (19.4)	−0.2 (31.6)	5.8 (42.4)	12.2 (54.0)	17.7 (63.9)	20.8 (69.4)	18.0 (64.4)	12.2 (54.0)	3.8 (38.8)	−3.4 (25.9)	−6.2 (20.8)	5.4 (41.6)
Daily mean °C (°F)	−14.2 (6.4)	−12.5 (9.5)	−6.6 (20.1)	0.4 (32.7)	6.4 (43.5)	12.0 (53.6)	15.1 (59.2)	12.6 (54.7)	7.5 (45.5)	0.1 (32.2)	−7.4 (18.7)	−10.8 (12.6)	0.2 (32.4)
Mean daily minimum °C (°F)	−18.9 (−2.0)	−18.0 (−0.4)	−13.0 (8.6)	−5.1 (22.8)	0.5 (32.9)	6.3 (43.3)	9.4 (48.9)	7.1 (44.8)	2.8 (37.0)	−3.6 (25.5)	−11.3 (11.7)	−15.3 (4.5)	−4.9 (23.1)
Mean minimum °C (°F)	−32.8 (−27.0)	−32.2 (−26.0)	−27.4 (−17.3)	−16.9 (1.6)	−6.3 (20.7)	−0.3 (31.5)	2.8 (37.0)	−0.8 (30.6)	−4.4 (24.1)	−15.1 (4.8)	−24.0 (−11.2)	−29.8 (−21.6)	−36.1 (−33.0)
Record low °C (°F)	−46.0 (−50.8)	−42.6 (−44.7)	−36.8 (−34.2)	−29.0 (−20.2)	−14.5 (5.9)	−5.5 (22.1)	0.4 (32.7)	−4.0 (24.8)	−12.0 (10.4)	−24.6 (−12.3)	−35.5 (−31.9)	−41.0 (−41.8)	−46.0 (−50.8)
Average precipitation mm (inches)	40.2 (1.58)	33.1 (1.30)	22.0 (0.87)	22.4 (0.88)	48.8 (1.92)	67.5 (2.66)	96.4 (3.80)	84.9 (3.34)	68.8 (2.71)	47.7 (1.88)	36.4 (1.43)	46.3 (1.82)	614.5 (24.19)
Source 1: SMHI Open Data for Jokkmokk, precipitation
Source 2: SMHI Open Data for Jokkmokk, temperature

Climate data for Jokkmokk, 1971-2000
Month	Jan	Feb	Mar	Apr	May	Jun	Jul	Aug	Sep	Oct	Nov	Dec	Year
Mean daily maximum °C (°F)	−9.3 (15.3)	−7.7 (18.1)	−1.8 (28.8)	3.5 (38.3)	10.5 (50.9)	16.5 (61.7)	19.2 (66.6)	16.3 (61.3)	10.3 (50.5)	3.3 (37.9)	−4.6 (23.7)	−8.2 (17.2)	4.0 (39.2)
Daily mean °C (°F)	−14.8 (5.4)	−12.9 (8.8)	−7.5 (18.5)	−1.2 (29.8)	5.6 (42.1)	11.8 (53.2)	14.5 (58.1)	11.9 (53.4)	6.4 (43.5)	0.2 (32.4)	−8.4 (16.9)	−13.2 (8.2)	−0.6 (30.9)
Mean daily minimum °C (°F)	−20.2 (−4.4)	−18.4 (−1.1)	−13.4 (7.9)	−6.3 (20.7)	0.4 (32.7)	6.9 (44.4)	9.8 (49.6)	7.8 (46.0)	2.8 (37.0)	−3.0 (26.6)	−12.6 (9.3)	−18.1 (−0.6)	−5.4 (22.3)
Average precipitation mm (inches)	31.4 (1.24)	21.8 (0.86)	24.3 (0.96)	22.3 (0.88)	37.0 (1.46)	57.7 (2.27)	84.3 (3.32)	69.3 (2.73)	45.0 (1.77)	40.3 (1.59)	40.0 (1.57)	30.6 (1.20)	504 (19.85)

== See also ==
- Kåbdalis
