= Skierfe =

Mountain in Sarek national park, Sweden

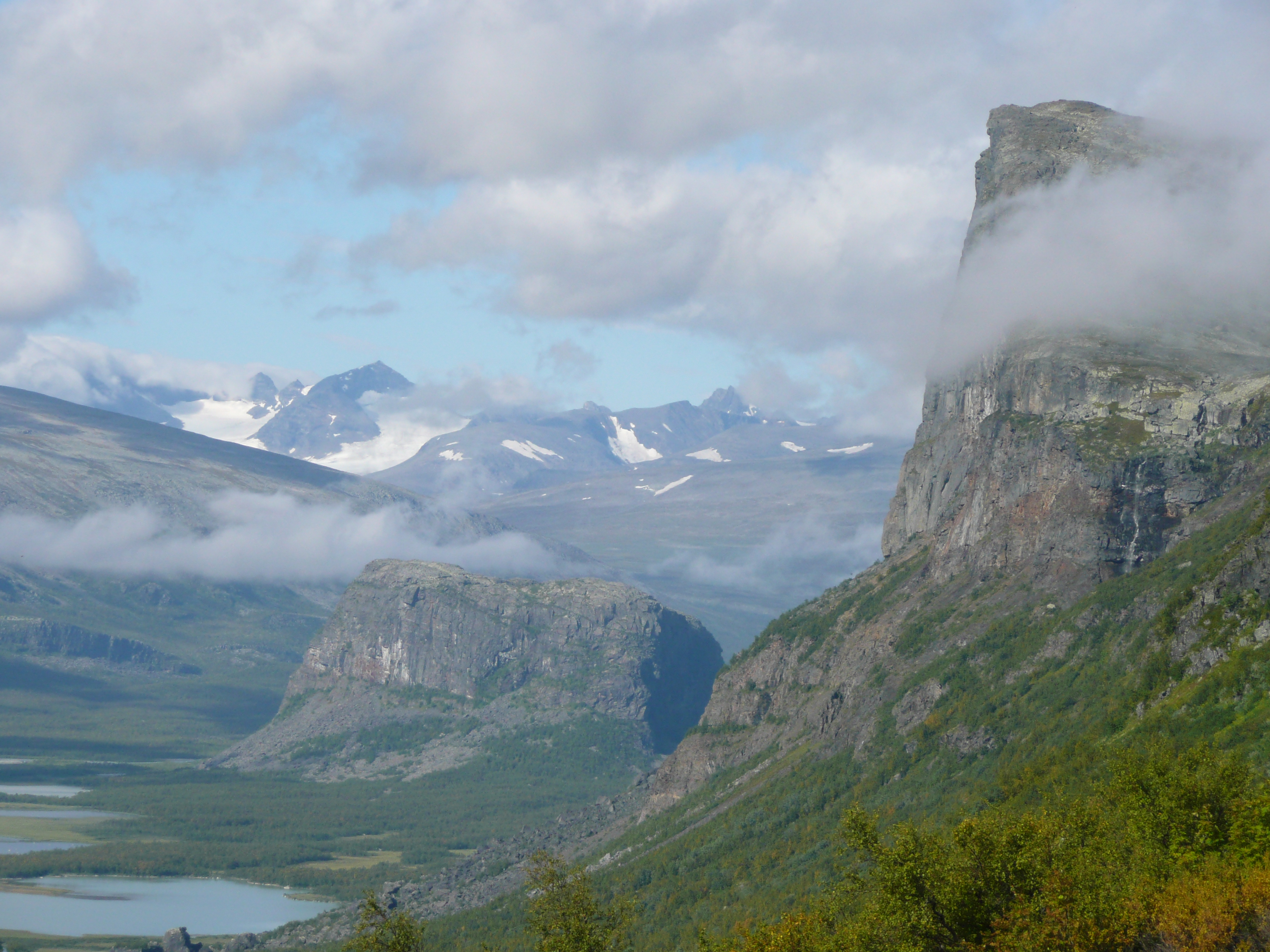
- Skierfe is on the east side of the lower parts of Rapa Valley

Highest point
- Elevation: 1,179 m (3,868 ft)

Geography
- Country: Sweden
- County: Norrbotten County
- Municipality: Jokkmokk Municipality
- Range coordinates: 67°10′3″N 18°11′54″E

Skierfe is a mountain in the south-eastern parts of Sarek National Park in Sweden. Its western cliff face is almost vertical and goes down to Rapa River and the Laitaure delta. The mountain is 1,179 m (3,868 ft) high.

Skierfe is known for the spectacular point of view one can get from the top in good weather. The path to the top is generally an easy hike and Skierfe is therefore a popular detour for people wandering along the Kungsleden trail. It is about 800 m (2,600 ft) above the Aktse mountain hut.
