= Pierikpakte =

Mountain in Sweden

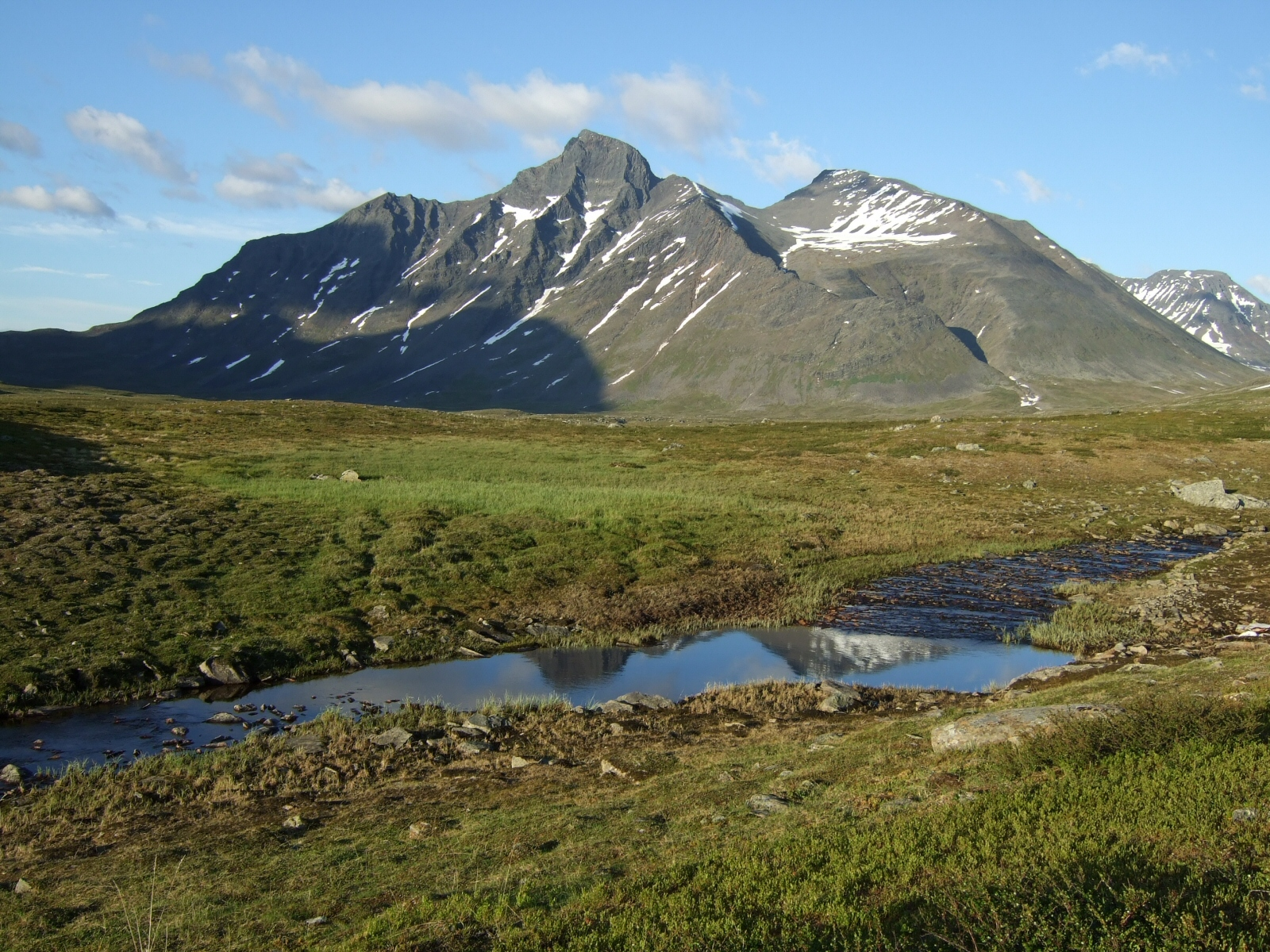
Pierikpakte from west (the high plains of Pielavalta).

Pierikpakte is a mountain in the Äpar massif and centrally located in Sarek National Park. The mountain rises to 1789 m above sea level.

The mountain has an easily recognizable profile as seen from Pielavalta, one of the highest situated large highland plains in Sweden, at 820 m.

The Sami word Bierikbákte roughly translates to Fool's cliff, and this likely refers to the risks involved with scaling the mountain; the last stretches to the peak are very steep and exposed. Pierikpakte is one of the few mountains in Sweden that require technical climbing. Other such Swedish peaks are Saitaris and Kaskasapakte.
