= Saltoluokta =

Settlement in Jokkmokk Municipality, Sweden

Coordinates: 67°23′38″N 18°31′15″E

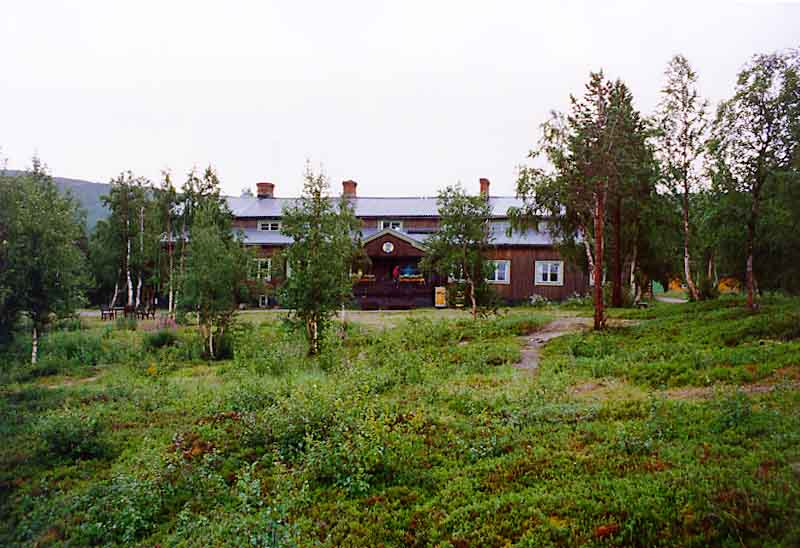
The main building, Saltoluokta

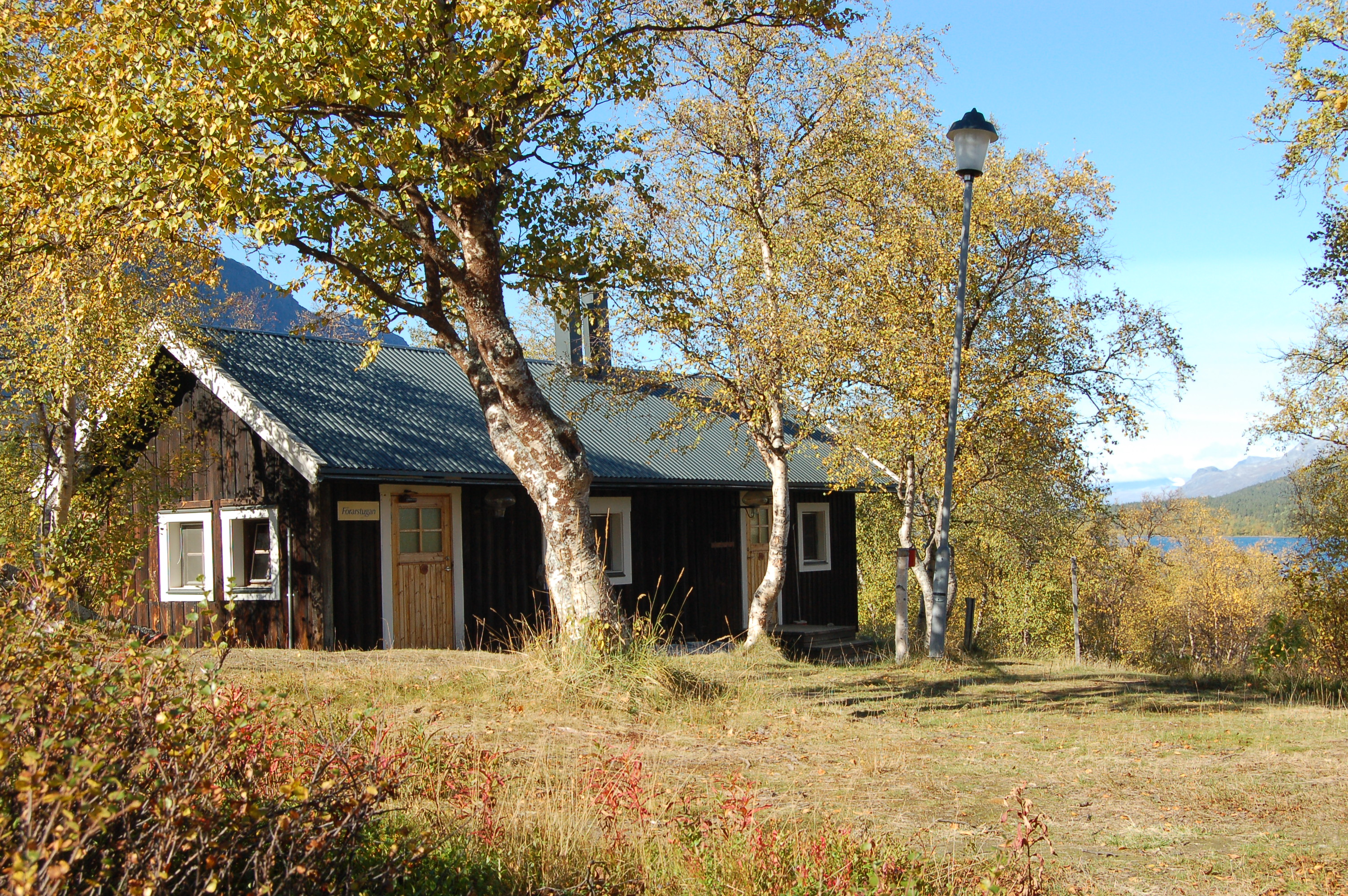
Driver's cabin, Saltoluokta

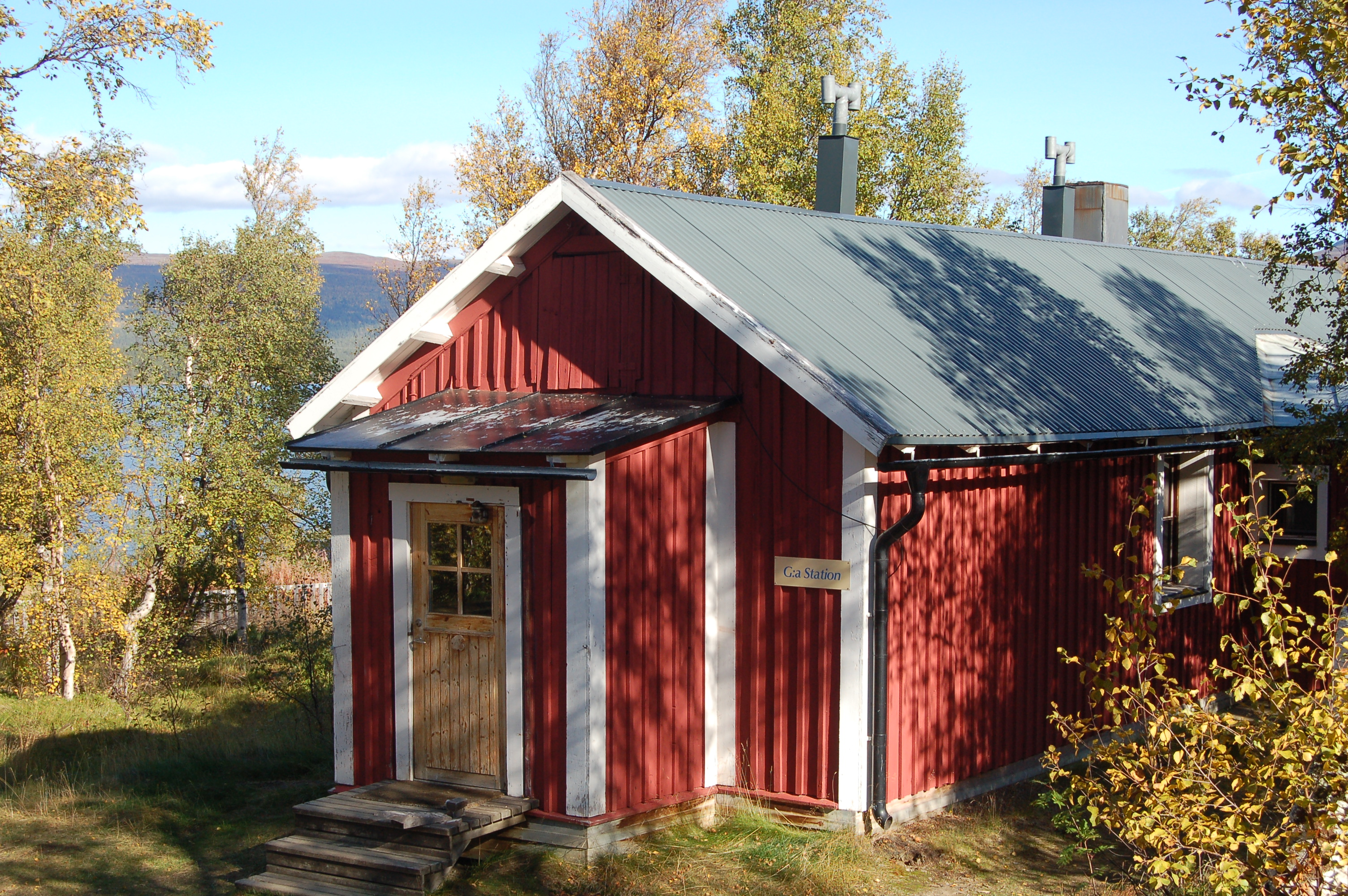
Old Station, Saltoluokta

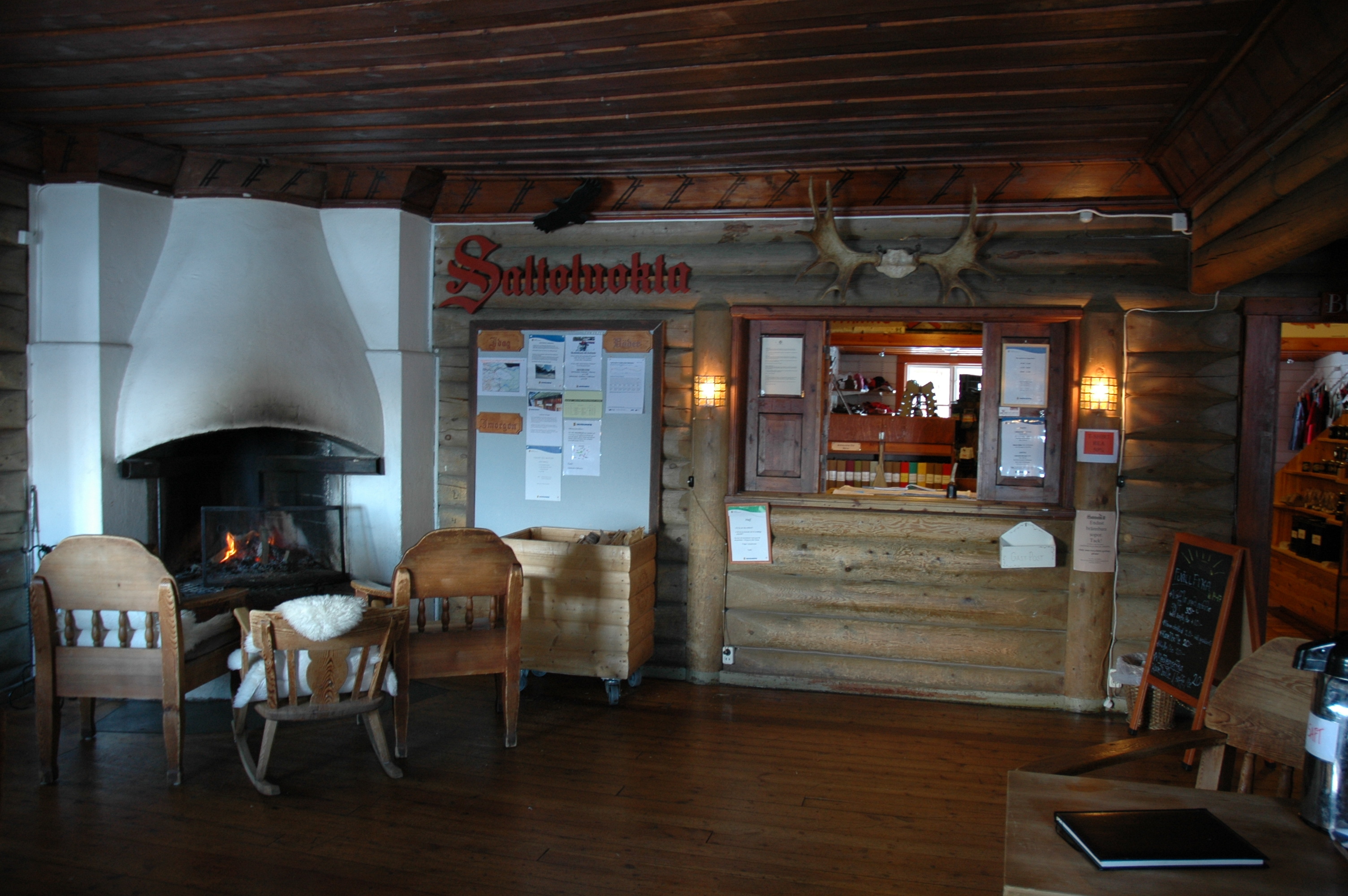
Reception Saltoluokta

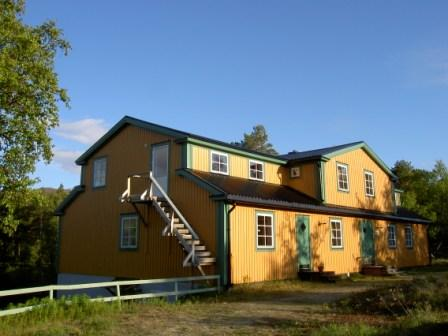
Laponia Saltoluokta

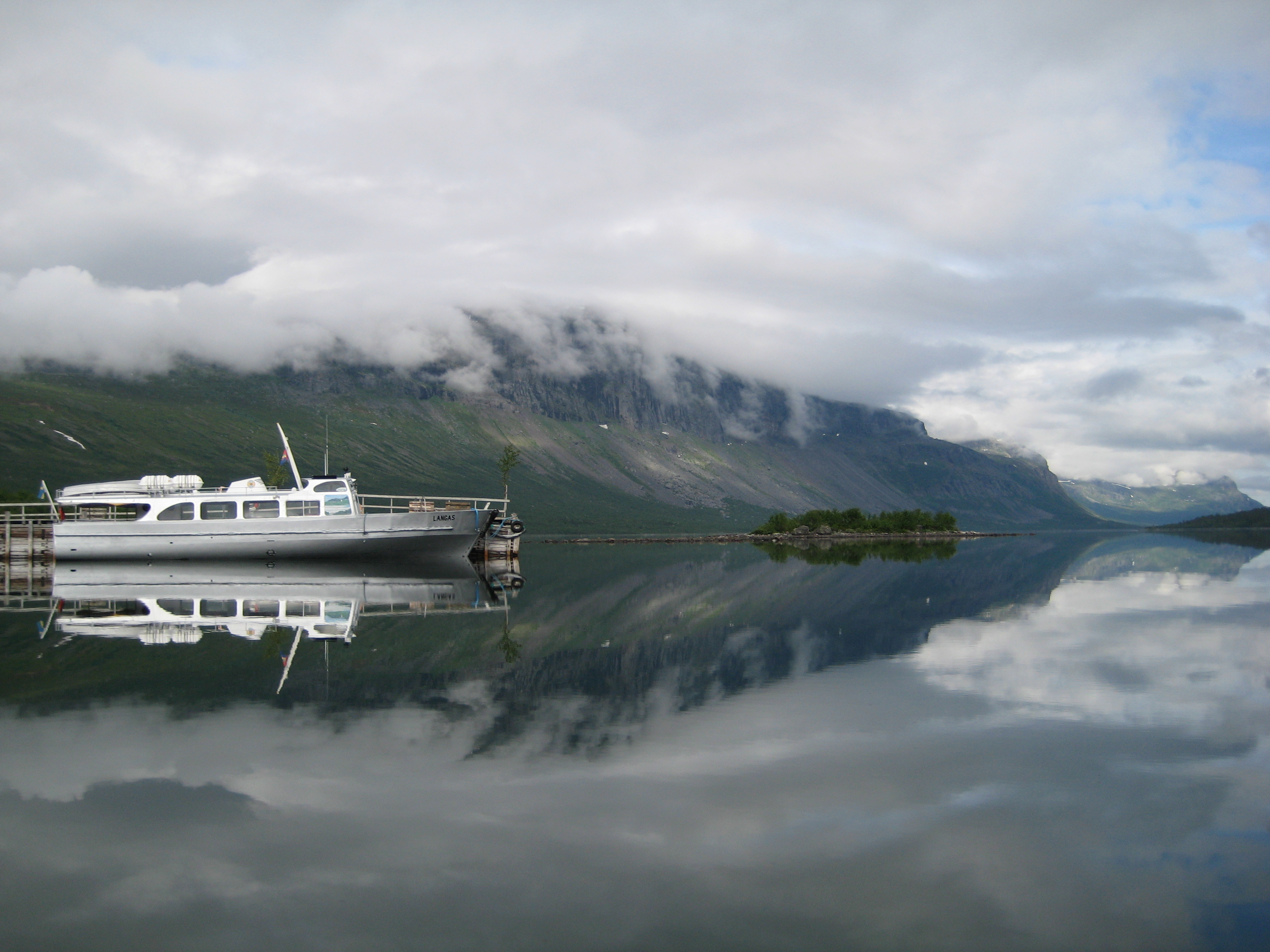
MS Langas, Saltoluokta

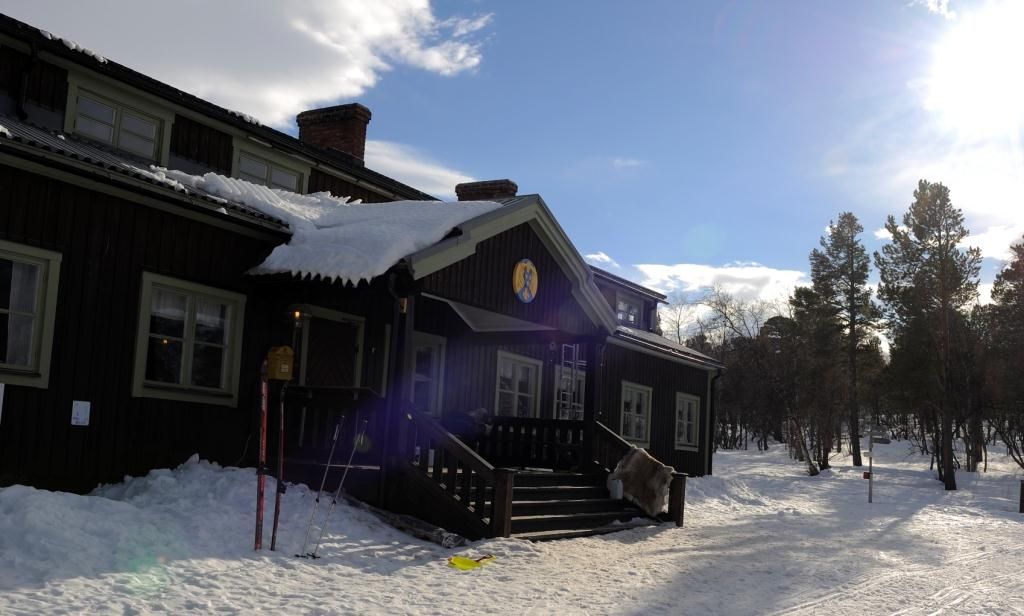
Main Building, Saltoluokta

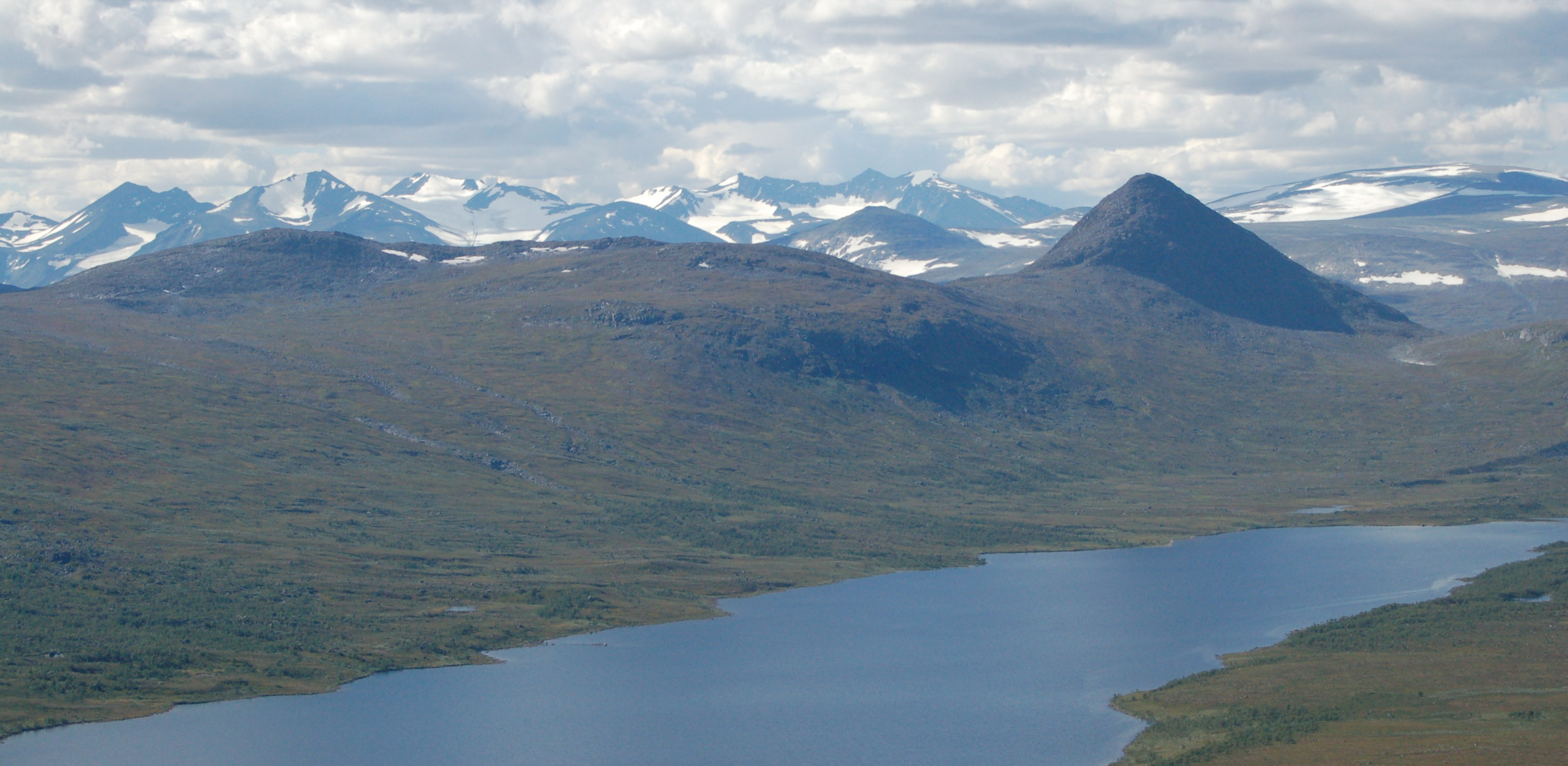
View of Sarek from Kierkau close Saltoluokta

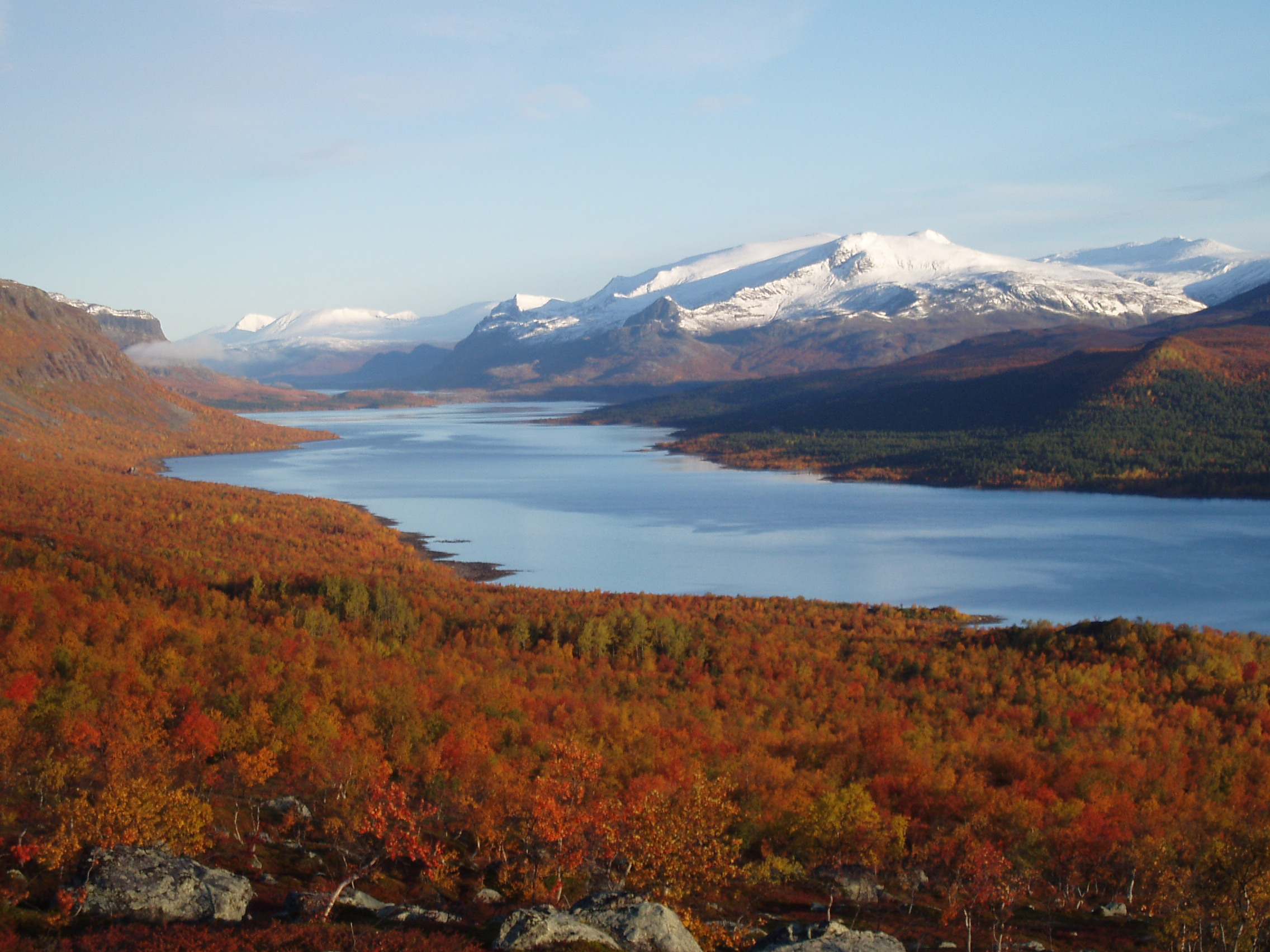
Saltoluokta in September

Saltoluokta (Swedish pronunciation: [ˈsǎlːtɔlʉɔkta]) is a 120 kilometer drive outside Gällivare in northern Sweden, off the beaten track in Jokkmokk Municipality near the municipality's border with Gällivare. Saltoluokta is located less than 1 kilometre from Stora Sjöfallet National Park and the UNESCO World Heritage Site Laponia and it is a popular starting point for Sarek National Park visitors.

== History ==
The place has always been one of Sirges Sami village's spring, summer, and autumn settlements. Swedish Tourist Association (STF) came to the area in 1890 and built The Great Falls cottage just below The Great Falls, which is one of Northern Europe's largest waterfalls. Some twenty years later more beds were needed for those who visited the site. Since the site was in the boundary of Stora Sjöfallet National Park, formed in 1909, it was decided to move the STF outside of the national park. It was decided to build it on sand ridges in Saltoluokta, one kilometer below the national park boundary and where Kungsleden (King's Trail) goes further south. The old station was built initially in 1912 and a year later the driver's cabin was built next door. Saltoluokta's main building was designed by architect John Åkerlund, and it was built in 1918 and extended further to include about 70 beds. The station's newest buildings came in the early 1980s when the Nåiden service building was built and in the mid-1990s when the Laponia annex Laponia was built. Today, the station has about 100 beds and all modern amenities including a restaurant, a small shop and sporting gear rentals. The station's main building is largely in original condition, with furniture and furnishings from 1918.

In 2014 a child climbing a tree outside the service building fell and broke her arm.

== Service ==
The main building houses a restaurant which serves food all day and has a three-course menu in the evening. There is also a small shop with all sorts of sweets, newspapers, beer, Sami handcrafts and more. In the Nåiden service building may be found sauna facilities, showers, drying rooms and a self-serve kitchen. There is also a rental department where one may rent everything anything needed for the mountain. Saltoluokta organizes guided tours and courses with everything from dog sledding to a boatrides to The Great Falls.

== Hours ==
Saltoluokta is a mountain lodge ("Fjällstation") with seasonal hours, which may vary from year to year. As a rule, the winter season is from mid-February to early May and the summer season is from early June to mid-September.

== Communications ==
To get to Saltoluokta Mountain Lodge one must cross the Langas lake from Kebnats jetty, which may be done in the summer months with boat MS Langas, a journey of about 10 minutes. During the winter it is crossed via skis or snowmobile traveling 4 kilometers along the winter trail.

Car - By car one may drive along the European route E45 between Gällivare and Jokkmokk. At 6 km north of Porjus one would go west and drive the remaining 78 kilometers to Kebnats for further transport to Saltoluokta.

Bus - Bus #93 runs every day between Gällivare and Kebnats and it stops in Porjus, where one may arrive by bus from Jokkmokk.

Flight - It is possible to fly from Stockholm-Arlanda Airport to Gällivare Airport with Nordica or Umeå with Air Sweden with connecting flights in Umeå to several major cities in Europe. From Gällivare Airport one may continue with by bus or taxi to Gällivare bus station and then take bus 93 to Kebnats. It is also possible to fly to Kiruna. From there one proceeds to Gällivare by train or bus.

Train - The Swedish train company SJ runs overnight trains from Gothenburg and Stockholm to Gällivare. They run daily tours, and from Gällivare one takes the connecting bus 93 to Kebnats.

== Nature and surroundings ==
Saltoluokta is located at the lake Langas which is part of Greater Lule River and Stora Sjöfallet National Park. At 10 kilometers upstream (west, northwest) is The Great Falls since prior to the dam construction it was one of Europe's largest waterfalls. Between Saltoluokta and The Great Falls along the lake's southern shore, the mighty mountain Kierkau lies, and the view from Saltoluokta to The Great Falls is a well known and often depicted silhouette that can be seen at Stockholm Central station. From Kierkau's peak, which is a short hike from Saltoluokta, one may see far into the Sarek National Park.

South of Kierkau and 5 km from Saltoluokta is the Lake Petsjaure, which offers fine trout fishing.

South along the Kungsleden Trail is Sitojaure which is a mountain hut operated by the Swedish Tourist Association, and from there one may continue down to Kvikkjokk and on to Hemavan.

== Hiking and ski touring ==
Saltoluokta is located along Kungsleden Trail, which is a popular destination for hikers. Many people choose to begin or end the long hike at Saltoluokta. Sarek hikers are also often based at Saltoluokta.

During the winter season, many skiers go to Saltoluokta to ski along the Kungsleden Trail or to Sarek.

There are many families who come to Saltoluokta because it is a relatively easy mountain and includes a beautiful environment around the station. There are also many popular day trips and activities from which to choose.

== Saltoluokta Music Festival ==
Every year in late June is a music festival hosted at Saltoluokta where both well-known and local folk musicians go on stage. The festival was first held in 1977 and since then there have been over 36 successful and popular festivals.
