= Lesser Lule River =

Coordinates: 66.54416°N 20.17104°E

- Native name: Lilla Luleälven (Swedish)

Location
- Country: Sweden

Physical characteristics
- Length: 238 km (148 mi)

The Lesser Lule River (Swedish: Lilla Luleälven) is a tributary of the Lule River in north Norrland, in Norrbotten County, Sweden. The river, which is entirely within the municipality of Jokkmokk, is 238 km long, with a drainage basin of approximately 9800 km². The longest tributary of the Lesser Lule River is called Tarrajåkkå and it originates in the southern part of Sarek Fell. The river flows southeast, passing Lakes Saggat (302 amsl), Skalka (295 amsl) and Randi (284 amsl) before it reaches Jokkmokk. After Jokkmokk, it flows towards Vuollerim where it joins the Greater Lule River. The river's largest tributaries are the Rapa (Lule Sami: Rapaätno, Swedish: Rapaälven) and Pärl Rivers. The waterflow of the Lesser Lule River is regulated.

== Hydroelectrical plants along the Lesser Lule River ==
The Lesser Lule River has several hydro-electric power stations on it. All of the station are owned by Vattenfall AB. These plants have cut off the traditional migratory routes followed by the Sámi in the area, causing some of the reindeer herders to have to truck the animals between the summer and winter camps.

Name	Year of completion	Normal annual electricity production (GW•h)	Maximum Capacity (MW)
Seitevare	1967	787	225
Parki	1970	85	20
Randi	1976	226	86
Akkats	1973	565	158
Letsi	1967	1850	456

== Sources ==
- Vattenfall AB
