= Rapa Valley =

Valley in Sweden

- Rapadalen, Ráhpavágge
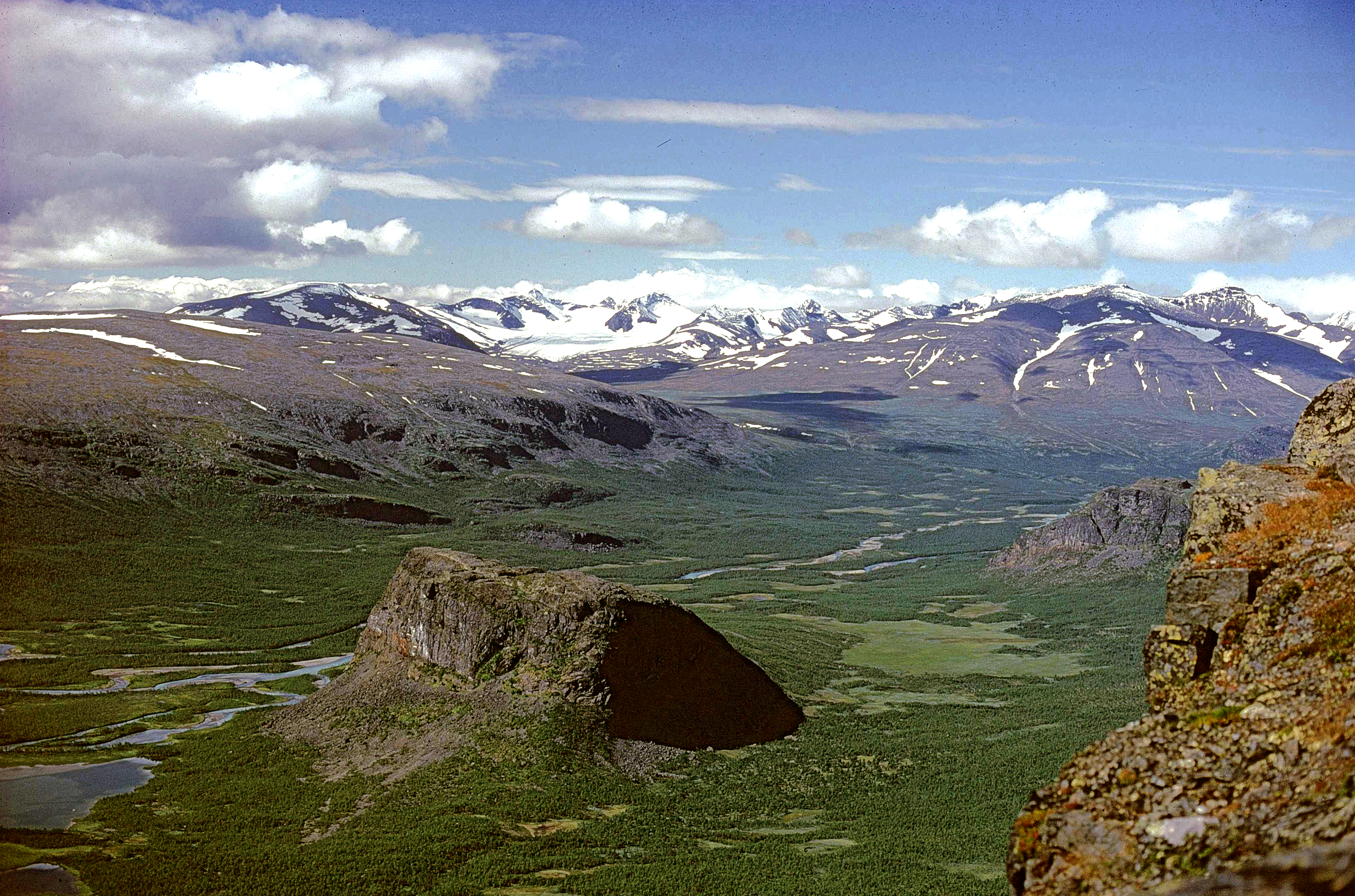
- The lower Rapa Valley
- Length: 35 kilometres (22 mi)

Geography
- Location: Sweden, Norrbotten, Jokkmokk
- Coordinates: 67°16′N 17°47′E
- Interactive map of Rapa Valley

The Rapa Valley (Swedish: Rapadalen, Sami: Ráhpavágge) is a 35 kilometres (22 mi) long valley in Sweden and the largest in the Sarek National Park, part of the Laponian area. The Rapa River runs through the valley, which is surrounded by steep mountains. Its Laitaure river delta is one of the major tourist attractions for hikers in the area.

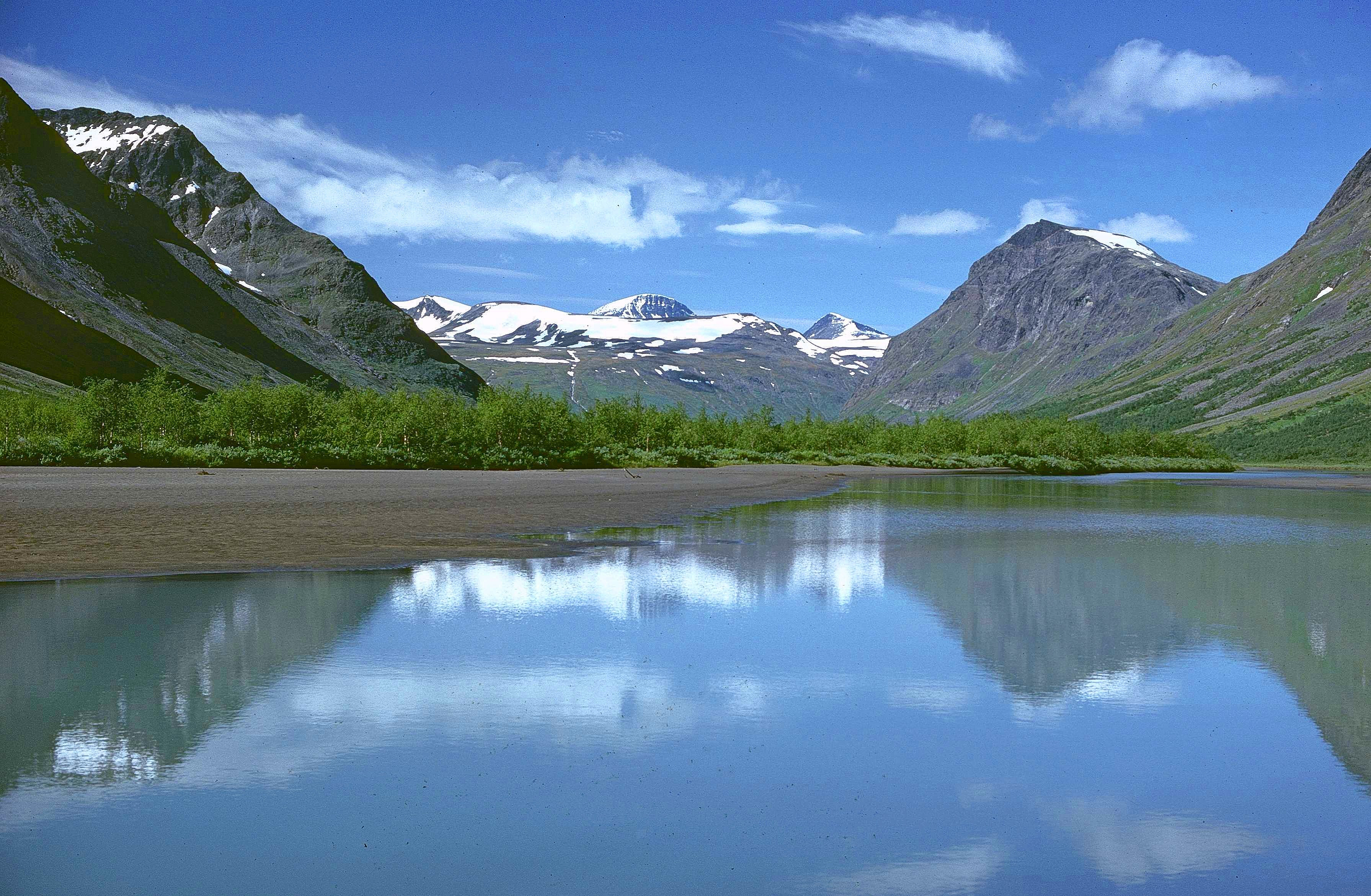

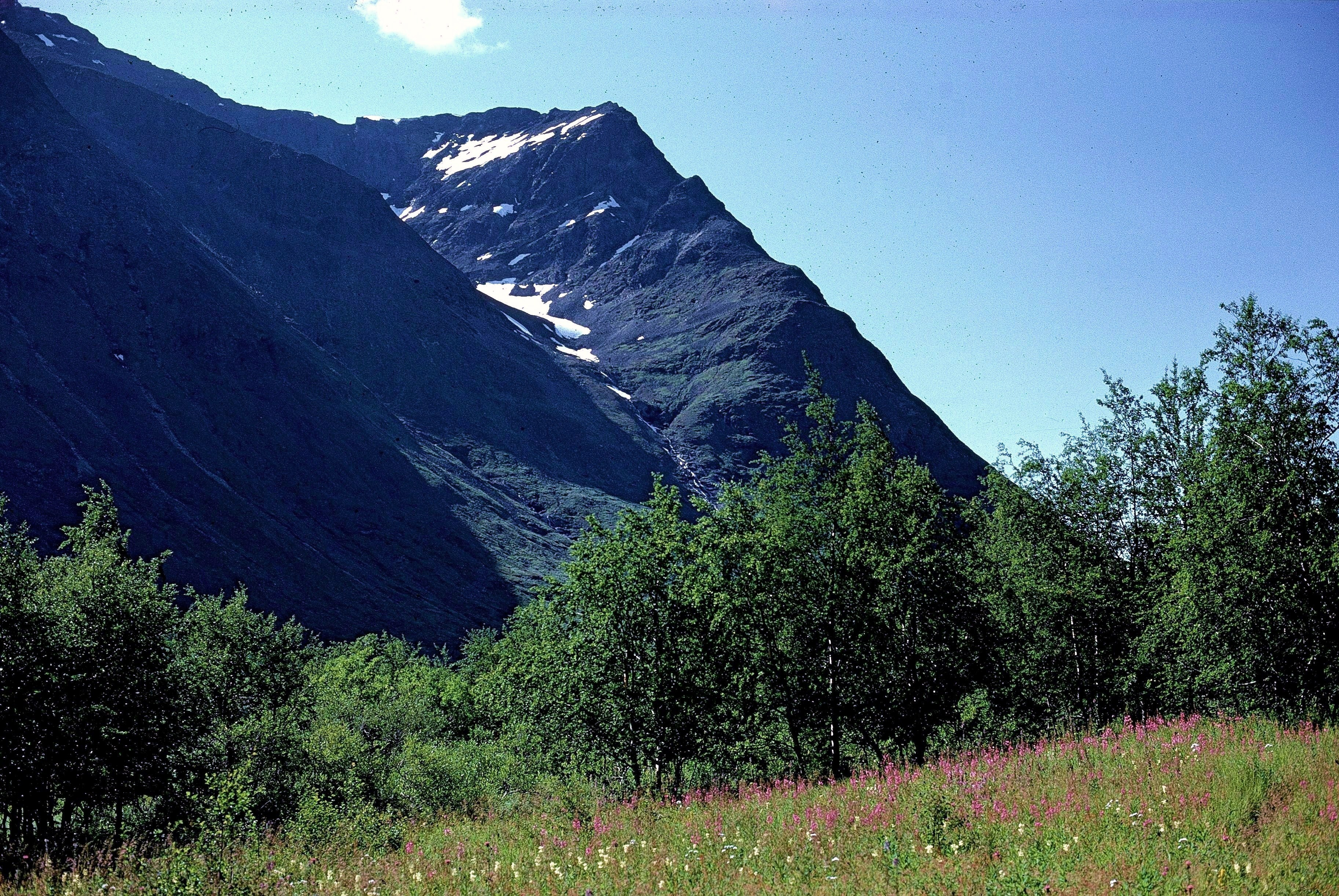

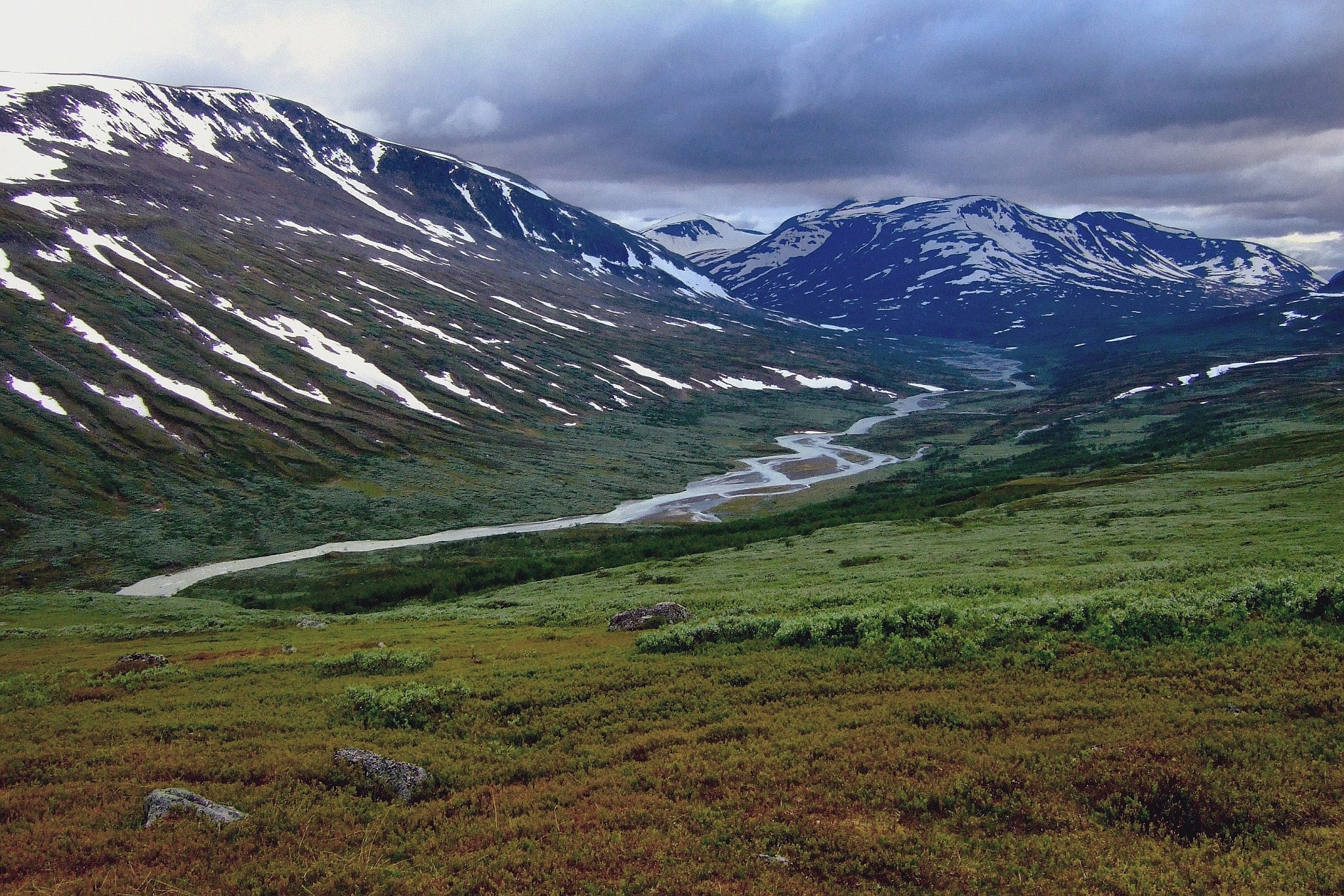
