= Alpine veronica =

Alpine veronica is a common name for several plants and may refer to:

- Veronica alpina, native to Europe and Asia
- Veronica wormskjoldii, native to North America
