= Rapa River =

Coordinates: 67°17′N 17°37′E

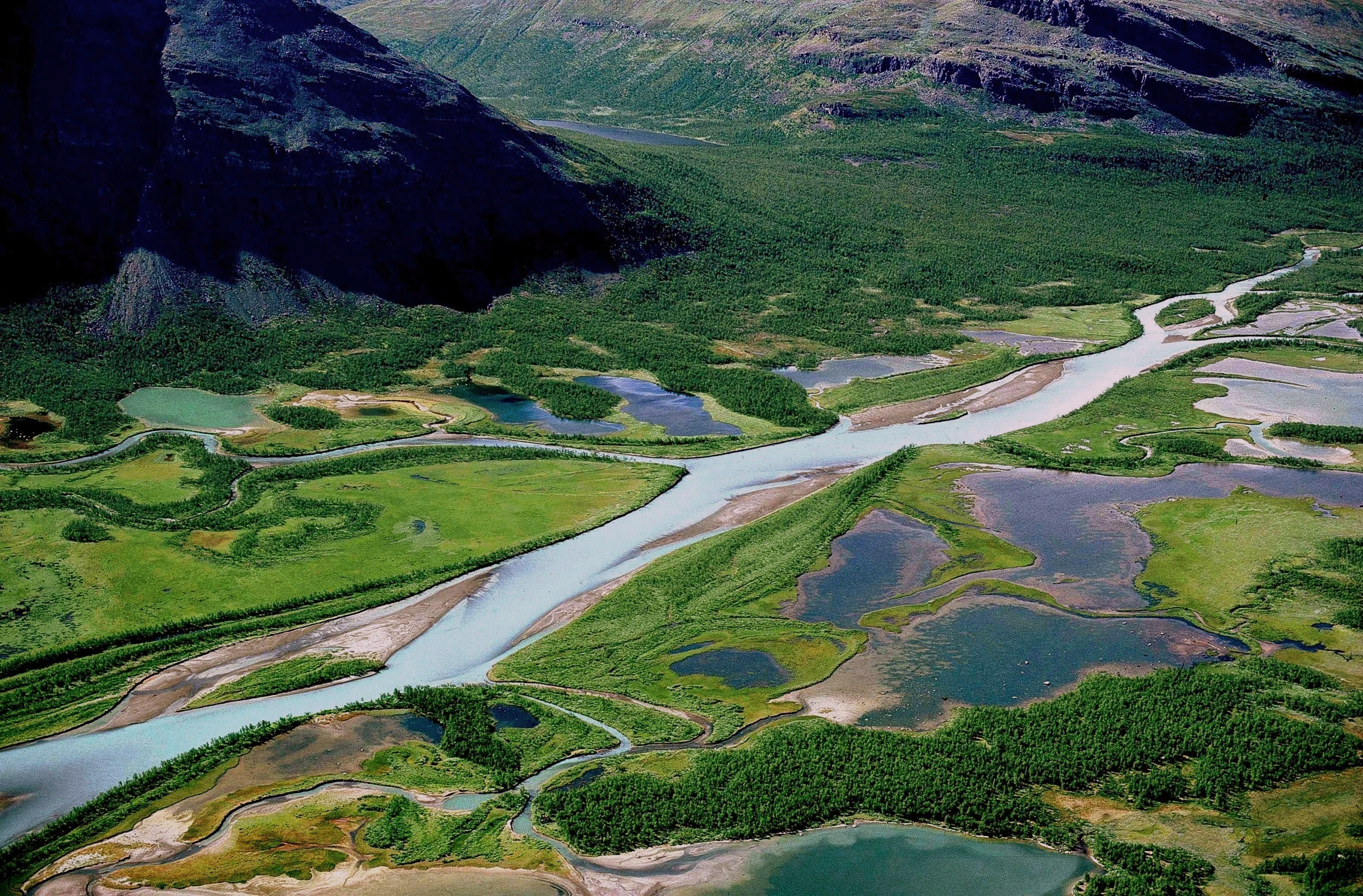
- The lower portion of the Rapa River near where it discharges into the delta.
- Native name: Rapaätno (Lule Sami); Rapaälven (Swedish)

Location
- Country: Sweden

Physical characteristics
- Length: 55 km (34 mi)

The Rapa River (Lule Sami: Rapaätno and Swedish: Rapaälven) is a tributary of the Lesser Lule River in north Norrland, in Norrbotten County, Sweden. The river stretches 75 km from its source to the mouth of Lake Tjaktjajaure (477 amsl). At the mouth of Lake Laitaure (Laidaure), slightly higher up, the Rapa River forms the Laitaure Delta. The river flows through the Rapa Valley, finally joining the Lule River.
