= Laitaure =

Lake in Jokkmokk Municipality, Norrbotten County, Sweden

Laitaure (Laidaure)
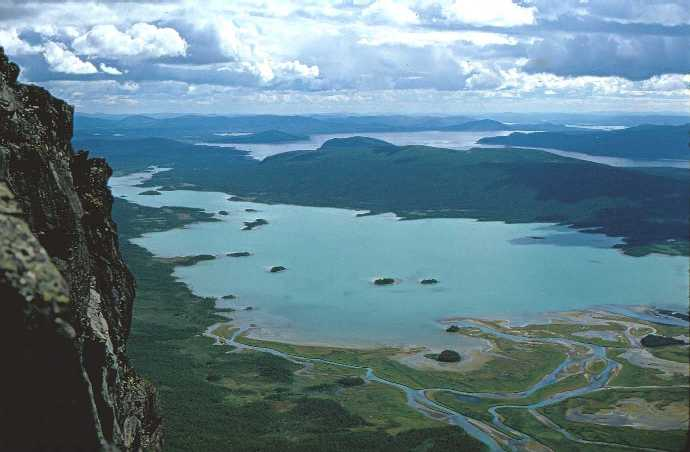

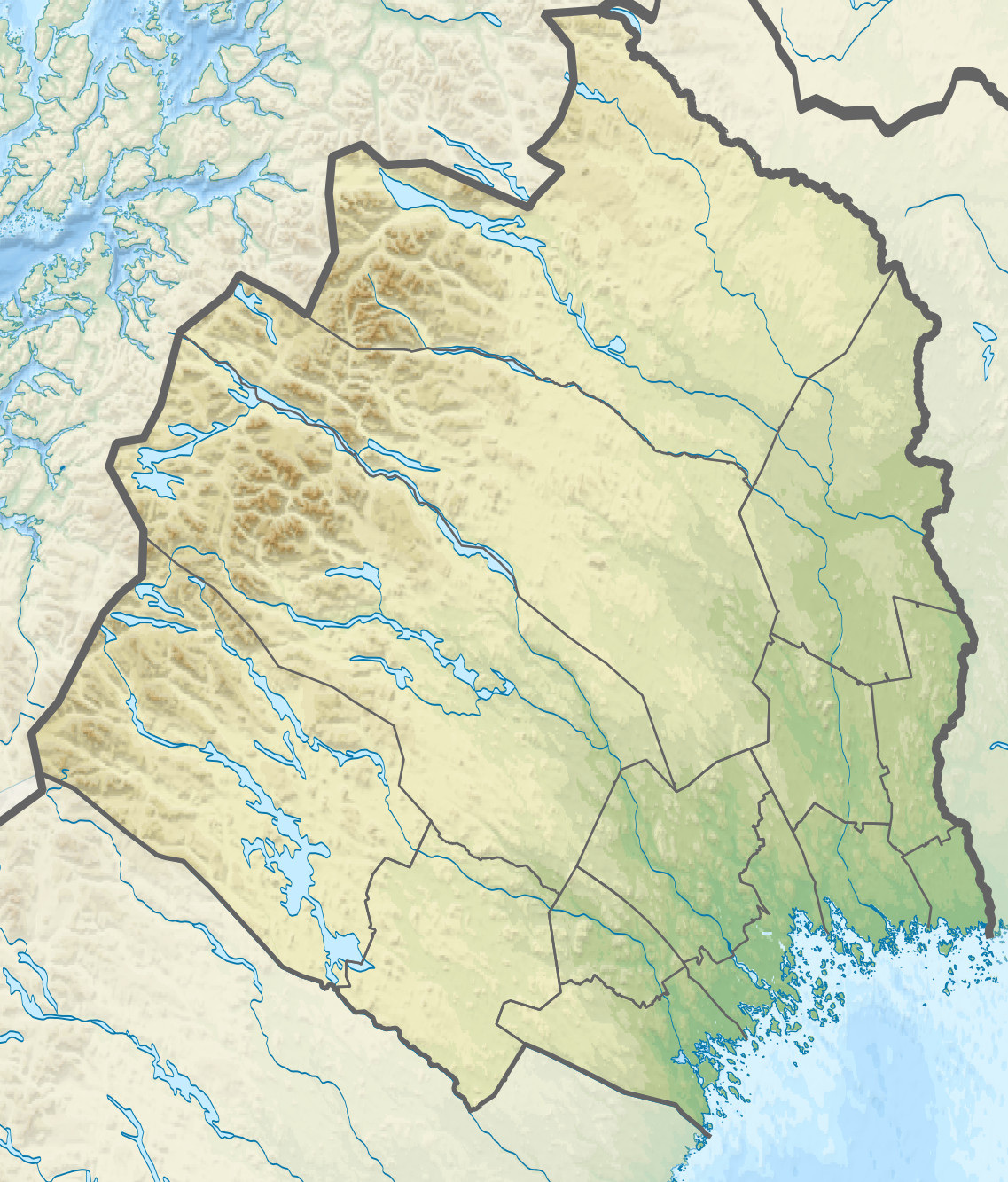
- Location within Norrbotten
- Location: Jokkmokk Municipality, Norrbotten County
- Coordinates: 67°08′N 18°17′E
- Primary inflows: Rapa River
- Basin countries: Sweden
- Max. length: 15 km (9.3 mi)
- Surface elevation: 498 m (1,634 ft)

Laitaure is a lake in Lapland, Sweden which is formed by the Rapa River.

== See also ==
- Kungsleden
