= Tjäktjapasset =

Mountain pass in the Kebnekaise area, Sweden

Coordinates: 68°01′11″N 18°14′50″E

Tjäktjapasset is a mountain pass about 1100 meters above sea level in the Kebnekaise area, Kiruna, Sweden. The Kungsleden trail runs in a north-south direction through this pass, connecting Sälka, which lies 9 km away, and Tjäktja, lying approximately 4 km away. There is also a shelter, where travellers are advised to remain if weather becomes harsh.
