= Kiruna Airport =

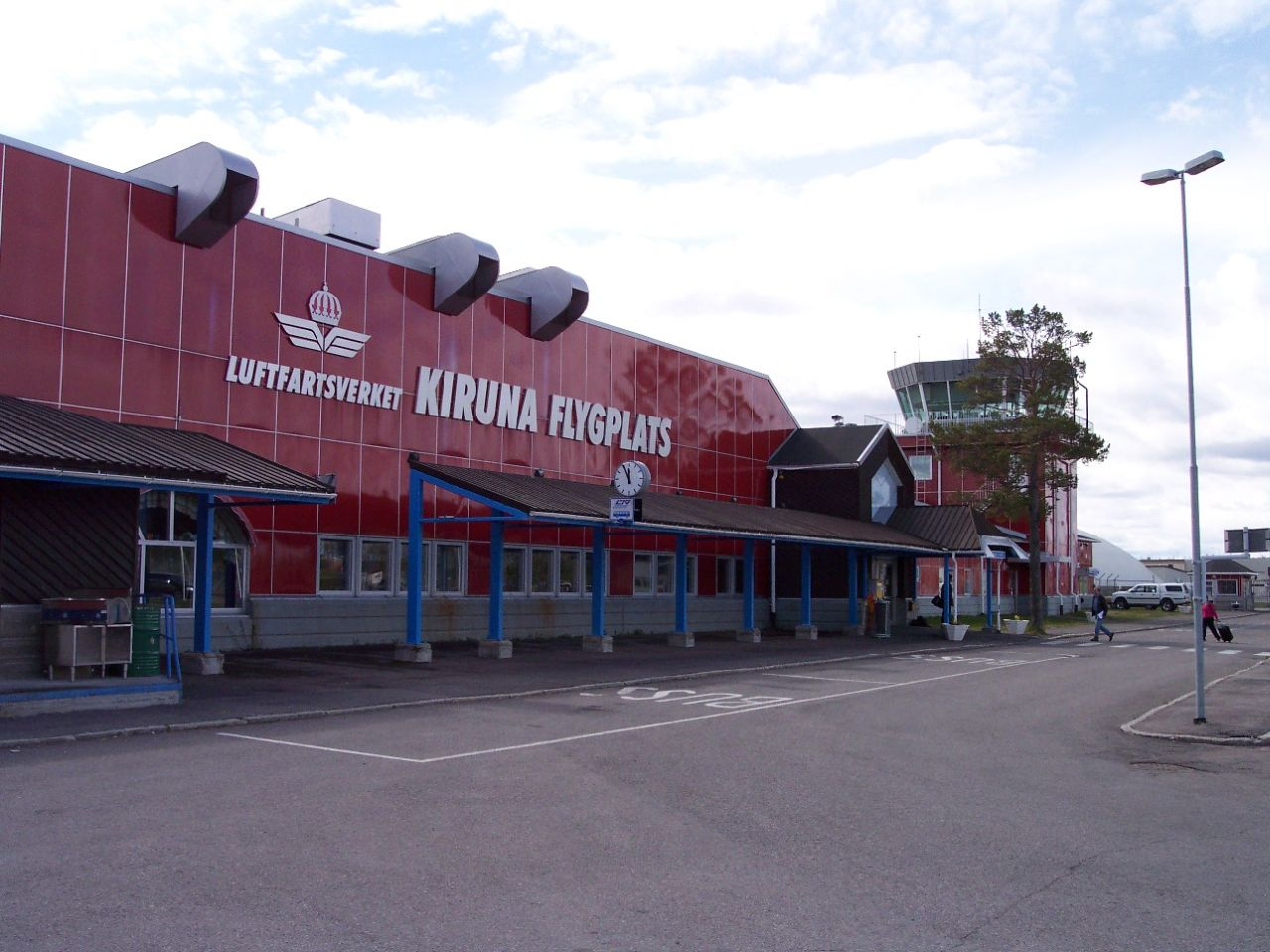
- IATA: KRN; ICAO: ESNQ

Summary
- Airport type: Public
- Operator: Swedavia
- Location: Kiruna, Norrbotten, Sweden
- Elevation AMSL: 1,509 ft / 460 m
- Coordinates: 67°49′20″N 020°20′12″E
- Website: swedavia.com/kiruna/

Map
- Location within Norrbotten KRN (Sweden)

Runways
Direction	Length		Surface
Direction	ft	m	Surface
03/21	8,208	2,502	Paved

Statistics (2018)
- Passengers total: 277,018
- International passengers: 4,374
- Domestic passengers: 272,644
- Landings total: 2,477

Kiruna Airport is the northernmost airport in Sweden. It lies around 10 km (6.2 mi) from the old town centre of Kiruna and around 4 km from the new town centre. In 2023, the airport served 217,075 passengers.

== Airlines and destinations ==
The following airlines operate regular scheduled and charter flights to and from Kiruna:

Airlines	Destinations
Air France	Seasonal: Paris–Charles de Gaulle
Eurowings	Seasonal: Düsseldorf
Norwegian Air Shuttle	Stockholm–Arlanda
Scandinavian Airlines	Stockholm–Arlanda; Seasonal: Copenhagen

There are additional scheduled helicopter flights for paying passengers in the mountain region of Kiruna. One such is Nikkaluokta-Kebnekaise mountain lodge, which goes twice daily in the summer season operated by Kallax Flyg.

== Statistics ==
Busiest routes to and from Kiruna Airport (2025)
Rank	Airport	Passengers handled
1	Sweden, Stockholm-Arlanda	239,299
2	Denmark, Copenhagen	8,141
3	Germany, Düsseldorf	2,103
4	France, Paris	1,717

Traffic by calendar year
Year	Passenger volume	Change	Domestic	Change	International	Change
2025	251,520	▲13.4%	239,008	▲10.2%	12,512	▲151.0%
2024	221,868	▲2.2%	216,884	▲1.4%	4,984	▲51.6%
2023	217,075	▲11.1%	213,787	▲10.6%	3,288	▲60.5%
2022	195,337	▲61.9%	193,288	▲60.9%	2,049	▲278.7%
2021	120,677	▲9.3%	120,136	▲12.0%	541	▼82.9%
2020	110,432	▼58.8%	107,267	▼59.2%	3,165	▼34.1%
2019	267,941	▼3.1%	263,138	▼3.3%	4,803	▲10.0%
2018	276,516	▼2.1%	272,149	▼1.3%	4,367	▼33.6%
2017	282,412	▲8.4%	275,834	▲9.1%	6,578	▼14.0%
2016	260,500	▲1.1%	252,851	▲1.1%	7,649	▲0.4%
2015	257,712	▼4.8%	250,090	▼3.7%	7,622	▼31.7%
2014	270,738	▲19.6%	259,576	▲23.0%	11,162	▼27.1%
2013	226,282	▲14.3%	210,964	▲11.1%	15,318	▲91.4%
2012	197,935		189,930		8,005	

== Accidents and incidents ==
- On 15 March 2012 a Norwegian Lockheed Hercules military transport plane crashed into the Kebnekaise mountain when approaching Kiruna Airport, the Norwegian C-130 Hercules accident. All five personnel on board died.

== Ground transportation ==
- Airport Transfer to and from Kiruna City Center available year-round for flights to and from Stockholm, operated by Falcks Omnibus on behalf of Kiruna Municipality
- Bus 91 to Abisko - Riksgränsen - Narvik departs one time per day from the airport around February - may and June - September
- Nikkaluoktaexpressen to Nikkaluokta departs once or twice per day in march - may and June - September
