= 2012 Norwegian Air Force C-130 crash =

Aviation accident in Sweden

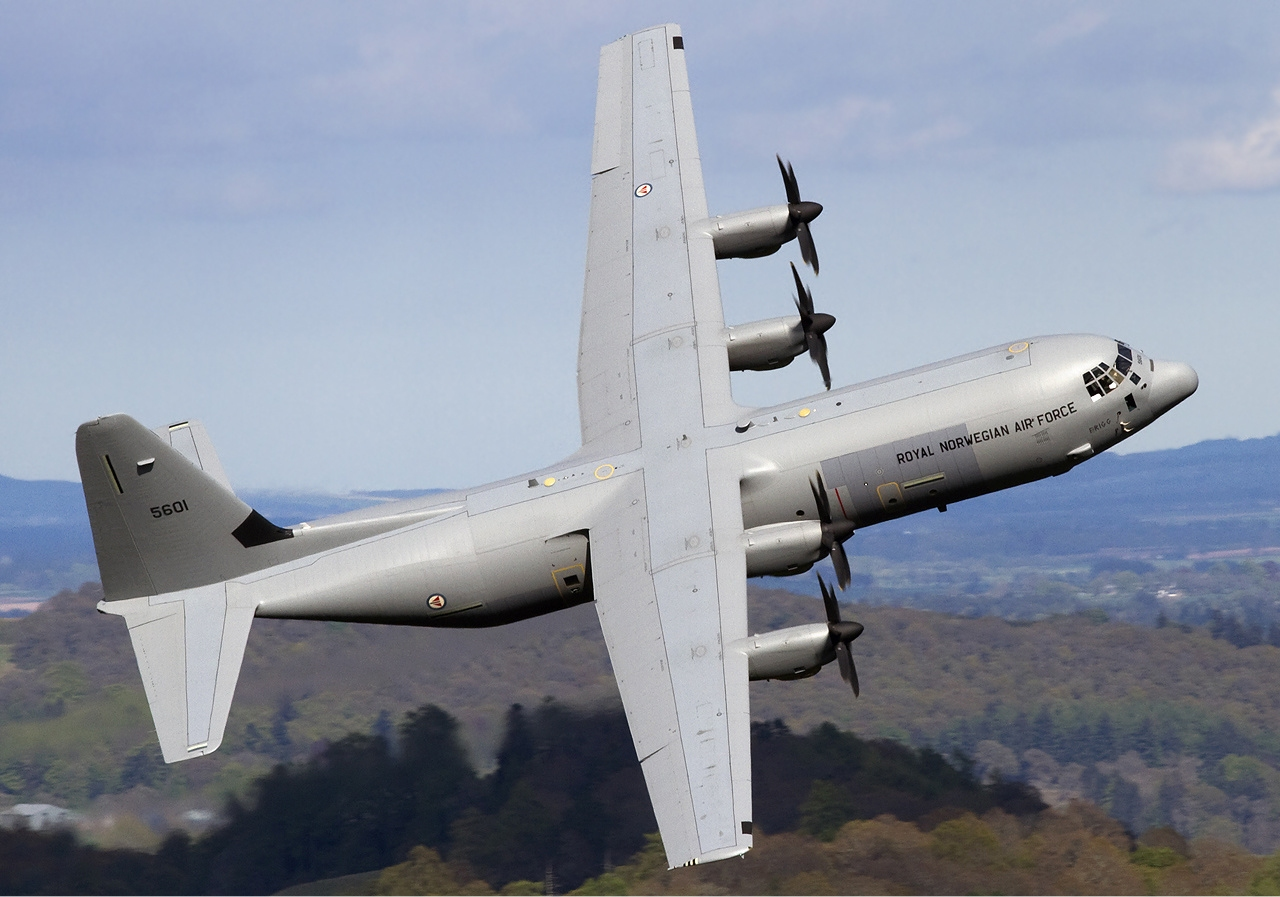
- A Royal Norwegian Air Force C-130 similar to the one involved

Accident
- Date: 15 March 2012
- Summary: Controlled flight into terrain due to pilot error and ATC error
- Site: Mount Kebnekaise, Lapland, Sweden; 67°54′N 18°31′E

Aircraft
- Aircraft type: Lockheed Martin C-130J Super Hercules
- Aircraft name: Siv
- Operator: Royal Norwegian Air Force
- Call sign: HAZE 01
- Registration: 5630
- Flight origin: Harstad/Narvik Airport, Harstad, Norway
- Destination: Kiruna Airport, Kiruna, Sweden
- Occupants: 5
- Crew: 5
- Fatalities: 5
- Survivors: 0

On 15 March 2012, a C-130J Super Hercules military transport aircraft of the Royal Norwegian Air Force (Norwegian: Luftforsvaret) crashed into the western face of Mount Kebnekaise near Kiruna, Sweden. All five people on board were killed.

== Accident ==
The plane left Evenes Airport at 13:40 and was scheduled to arrive at Kiruna Airport at 14:30. The aircraft was participating in the "Cold Response" military exercise, which also involved forces from Germany, Britain, Canada, Denmark, France, the Netherlands, Sweden and the United States. The aircraft appeared to have flown straight onto the edge of the western wall of Kebnekaise, Sweden's highest mountain. According to a police spokesperson, the aircraft probably exploded after crashing, setting off an avalanche. Human remains were found in the avalanche area.

The radar plots show the aircraft maintained a straight course over the last 50 km of the flight until impact, in line with the planned route. The plots did not indicate tactical low-level flying, although that was an optional plan for part of the route if weather conditions allowed. Just prior to the crash, Swedish air traffic controllers at Kiruna cleared the Hercules to descend to 7,000 feet (2,100 meters). This altitude is just 20 meters above the height of the top of the Kebnekaise mountain. The altitudes for the continuous radar plots remained in the possession of the accident investigation board and were not released.

== Aircraft ==
The aircraft involved was a Lockheed Martin C-130J Super Hercules four-engine turboprop military transport aircraft with RNoAF serial 5630. It was the last of four such planes acquired by the Norwegian military between 2008 and 2010 and was named Siv.

The commander, 42-year-old Ståle Garberg, had 6229 flight hours, while the first officer, 46-year-old Truls Audun Ørpen, had 3286 flight hours. Both were considered to be experienced airmen.

== Victims ==
A total of five people (a crew of four plus an extra officer) were aboard the aircraft when it crashed. All of them were Royal Norwegian Air Force officers and "among the most experienced" in the Norwegian military, according to the head of the Norwegian Armed Forces. The names of the missing were released by the military on 16 March 2012.

== Timeline ==
- 13:40 The Norwegian Hercules plane takes off from Evenes in northern Norway, destination Kiruna, Sweden.
- 14:43 Radio contact with the plane.
- 14:5x The Kiruna Airport control tower had radio contact with the plane shortly before the last radar observation. The exact time and details or transcripts of this conversation were not published during the investigation.
- 14:56 Last radar observation of the aircraft just west of the 6950 feet high Kebnekaise mountain peaks, by civilian radar (Kiruna, distance 75 kilometres (47 mi)) at 7200 feet. Military radar at Sørreisa (distance 130 kilometres (81 mi)) registered last altitude at 7600 feet at about the same time.

== Aftermath ==
Following the accident, a search effort led by Swedish rescue service was launched, but was hampered by snow, wind and cloud cover, impeding helicopter reconnaissance. Around 4 pm Central European Time on 16 March, a Norwegian P-3 Orion aircraft participating in the search spotted an orange or red object on the ground in the Kebnekaise mountain range. Danish EH101 helicopters attempted to locate and identify the object, but due to the weather conditions, the search was called off before any finds were made. Later thousands of pieces of wreckage and debris were located at the site identified by the Orion aircraft. Some of the parts showed burn marks and smelled of kerosene. Footage recorded by the Orion plane showed what appeared to be soot and ashes spread over the side of the mountain. Through the use of search dogs, human remains were discovered and relocated for DNA testing, and subsequently on 17 March the search for survivors was called off since it was believed that all five people on board had been killed and the aircraft destroyed. Efforts were refocused on an accident investigation.

== Investigation ==
The investigation was headed by the Swedish Accident Investigation Authority with participation of the Norwegian Accident Investigation Board. The aircraft is considered to have been completely destroyed by the impact and the following explosion, and on 22 March work began on moving debris from the temporary investigative base in Nikkaluokta near the crash site to an aircraft hangar at Kiruna Airport, but efforts were still being hampered by adverse weather and the discovery of further cracks in the glacier on which the debris is located. In August 2012 both the cockpit voice recorder and the flight data recorder were found and flown to the United Kingdom where experts at the Air Accidents Investigation Branch are aiding local authorities in salvaging data from the two recorders as Sweden does not have the expertise to handle flight recorders as damaged as the ones found in the wreckage. By 3 October 2012 NRK reported that data from the flight recorders had been successfully downloaded, and preliminary results have indicated that the terrain warning system was set for landing, so no warning was given before impact.

The accident report was repeatedly delayed, but was released by the Swedish Accident Investigation Authority (Statens haverikommission) on 22 October 2013 stating:

The accident was caused by the crew on HAZE 01 not noticing the shortcomings in the clearances issued by the air traffic controllers and to the risks of following these clearances, which resulted in the aircraft coming to leave controlled airspace and be flown at an altitude that was lower than the surrounding terrain

In 2019 it became known that the flight crew did not have maps showing the height of Kebnekaise mountain. The map they were issued had little or wrong information about the terrain in Sweden, because the Air Force lacked map data for Sweden. This was information that did not appear clearly in the accident report, but as an internal investigation by the Air Force, started after a former Air Force employee had notified about it in 2017.
