= Rotation Curation =

Social media technique

Rotation Curation, also #RotationCuration, is the concept of rotating the spokesperson on a broad scoped social media account. Such a scope can be a location, a country, an organization, a group, and so on. The concept is prominent on Twitter, but has also been ported to Instagram (for example la Bio au Labo).

== History ==
The concept originated December 10, 2011, when Svenska Institutet and VisitSweden launched Curators of Sweden. The project hands the official Twitter account @Sweden to a new Swedish person every week to manage, with the expressed goal to manifest Swedish diversity and progressiveness through their own personality.

The original idea has been reported on in mass media around the world and inspired the launch of many similar projects. The Twitter account @PeopleofLeeds started January 15, 2012, where citizens of Leeds represent their hometown. January 18, 2012, @WeAreAustralia and @TweetWeekUSA, followed by @CuratorsMexico and @BasquesAbroad January 21. On April 12 the people of The Netherlands got their account, known as @Netherlanders. All of these are unofficial accounts without governmental influence or sanctions, as well as the actual foundation for the concept of Rotation Curation, which is to let official and unofficial projects, countries, cities, companies, cultural, and, or other types of groups to rotate their spokespersons, curators, every week.

Initially most of these projects all had a location in common, which saw the creation of the concept Location Curation, with the hashtag #LocationCuration. When the idea spread to organisations unbound by location the expression was abandoned. Because of their common concept of rotating the holder of the account, people on Twitter decided to use the expression #RotationCuration, which was coined by the user @auldzealand March 22, 2012.

There are now also several science-themed rotation curation accounts used for science outreach to a broader community, including @RealScientists, @Biotweeps, and @Astrotweeps.

== See also ==
- Svenska Institutet
