= Salka (disambiguation) =

Salka or Selka may refer to:

== Religion ==
- Salka, Islamic recitation of Quran in Sufism

== People ==
- John Salka, American politician
- Rod Salka, American boxer
- Salka Sól Eyfeld, Icelandic singer
- Salka Viertel, Austrian actress

== Places ==
- Salka, Slovakian village
- Sälka, Swedish mountain range
- Salka Aerodrome, Russian aerodrome
- Salka and Berthold Viertel House, American home
- Šalka Vas, Slovenian settlement
