= Pirttivuopio =

Village in Kiruna Municipality, Sweden

Coordinates: 67.8726°N 19.2227°E

Pirttivuopio Veigi (Northern Sami) Veikki (Meänkieli)
- village
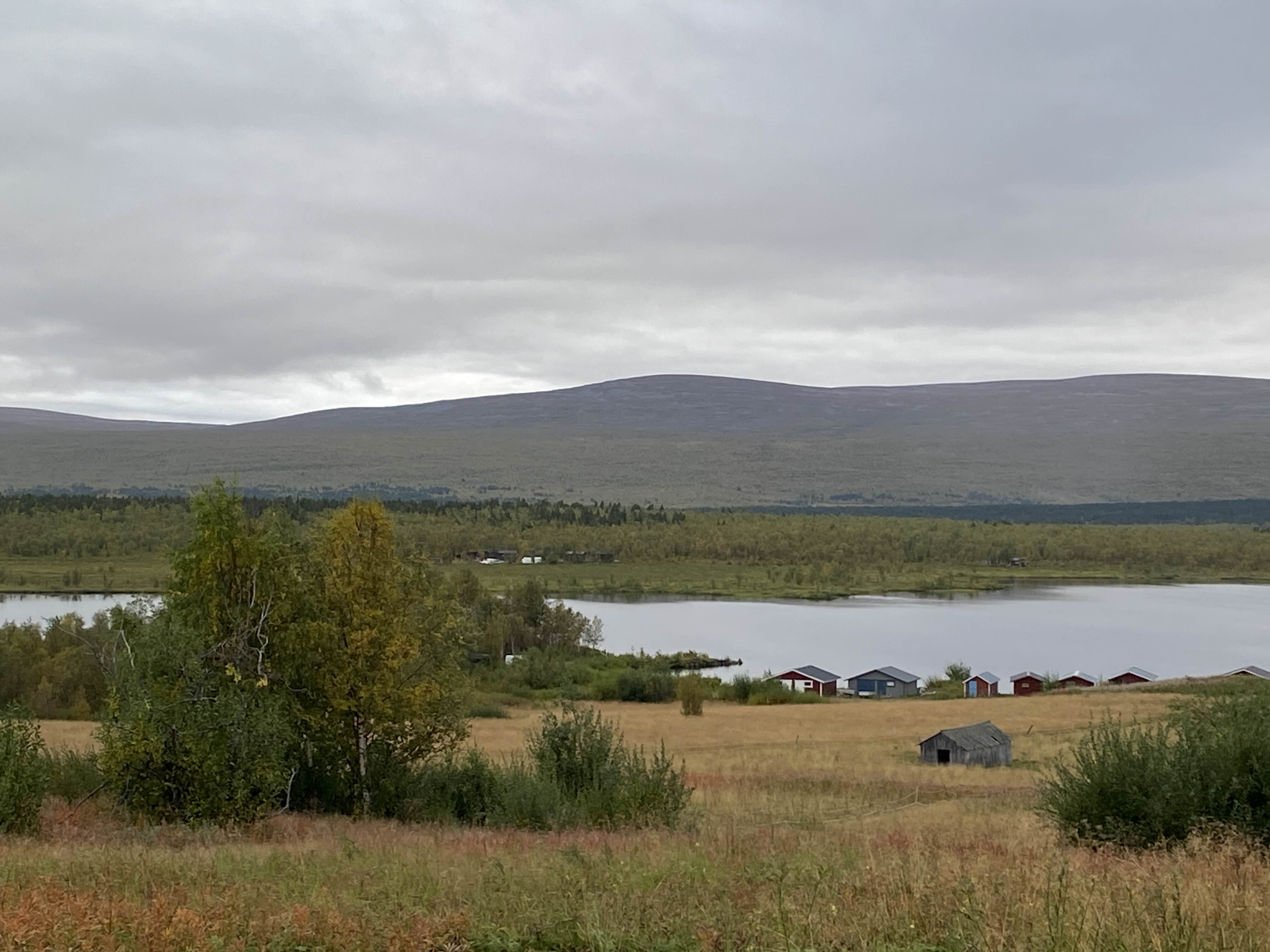
- Interactive map of Pirttivuopio
- Country: Sweden
- County/Län: Norrbotten County

Population
  - Total: 14

Pirttivuopio, also known as Veikki, is a village in Kiruna Municipality, Norrbotten County, Sweden. Pirttivuopio lies 55 kilometers west of Kiruna and 9 kilometers east of Nikkaluokta.

== History ==
Archaeological excavations have taken place in 2005-2006 and 2009 with finds including 45 firepits, several hearths and traces of goahti, among others. There is also supposed to have existed a fort called Reenbäcks fortress (Swedish: Reenbäcks fästning), erected in 1717 by the nobles of Tornio, it is unclear if it was ever used, though already in 1727 it was completely abandoned. No archaeological surveys have taken place of the supposed site of the fortress.

The village is known for the Kiruna Flying Club which hosts the Kebne Wave Camp in Pirttivuopio each year.

According to Ratsit.se on 18 September 2023 Pirttivuopio had 14 registered inhabitants above the age of 16. According to SCB on 31 December 2015 Pirttivuopio had a population of 7.
