= The Swedish Number =

Swedish tourism campaign

- Mission statement: To create interest in Sweden, to "connect people in troubled times," and to recruit people to the tourist association.
- Owner: Swedish Tourist Association; Intelcom; INGO Stockholm; the Swedish Institute; Visit Sweden (left development)
- Country: Sweden
- Launched: April 6, 2016
- Closed: July 25, 2016
- Status: Ended
- Website: www.theswedishnumber.com

The Swedish Number was a tourism campaign that used a phone number to call Swedes who volunteered to participate. It is by the Swedish Tourist Association, Intelcom, INGO Stockholm and the Swedish Institute. The campaign was started on April 6, 2016, and was ended on July 25.

== History ==
The campaign was in development for 2 years. Near a month before the campaign released, Visit Sweden left development, but the Swedish Institute joined development after.

On April 6, 2016, the Swedish Tourist Association, along with Intelcom, INGO Stockholm, and the Swedish Institute released the campaign. The campaign was released on the 250th anniversary of the removal of censorship in Sweden.

The campaign was supposed to be ended on June 6th if it didn't find a sponsor for the amount of money for maintaining the campaign's calls, but on July 25th, the campaign ended.

== Overview ==
A screenshot of the app used for the people who participated.

The campaign had a phone number (+46-771-793-336), to call random Swedes who signed up to be called on a website. In order for a caller to have a call, the Swede on the other side must accept the call through an app, and requests for calls only go to people who enable calls to go to them. Before the caller gets a response, a synthetic voice would say "You are calling Sweden, you will soon be connected to a random Swede somewhere in Sweden." All of the calls were recorded to prevent harassment.

The mission statement of the campaign was to create more interest to Sweden, to "connect people in troubled times," and to recruit more people to work in the tourism association.

The campaign reportedly had 197,678 calls. (Note: Number can vary, the article is using this one because it is posted after the campaign was finished and because it is more precise.) With most of the calls coming from the United States, Turkey, and the United Kingdom.

== Reception ==
One year after the campaign started, UNICEF, and Forsman & Bodenfors created a spinoff named "The Syrian Number," in reaction to the popularity of the campaign, and the effects of the Syrian civil war.

=== Accolades ===
List of awards and nominations
Year	Award	Category	Result	Ref.
2016	Clio Awards	Innovation	Won	
2016	Clio Awards	Direct	Won	
2016	Cannes Lions	Direct	Won (Note: Won Grand Prix.)	
2016	Cannes Lions	Innovation	Won	
2016	Cannes Lions	Engagement/Experiential	bronze	
2016	Cannes Lions	Public Relations	Shortlisted	
2017	One Show	Mobile Advertising	Won (Note: Won The Best In Discipline Pencil.)	
2017	One Show	User-Generated Content	silver	
2017	One Show	Innovation in Direct	gold	
2017	Effie Awards	Leisure & Lifestyle	silver	
2017	The Digital Dozen: Breakthroughs in Storytelling Awards	N/A	Won	
2017	DMA Echo Awards	Best Campaign under 250,000 Dollars	Won	
2017	DMA Echo Awards	Transport and Hospitality	Won	
2017	DMA Echo Awards	Best Use of Mobile	Won	
2017	DMA Echo Awards	Best Use of Experiential	Won	

== See also ==
- Curators of Sweden – a similar tourism campaign
