= Curators of Sweden =

Swedish social media campaign

Curators of Sweden was a social media campaign initiated by the government agency Swedish Institute and VisitSweden on Twitter. It was launched on December 10, 2011 with the main concept of a rotating spokesperson, or rather a curator, on the official Twitter account of Sweden, @sweden. The account has been cited as popularising the concept of Rotation Curation.

== History ==
The concept originated on December 10, 2011, when Swedish Institute and VisitSweden launched Curators of Sweden. The project hands the official Twitter account @Sweden to a new Swedish person every week to manage, with the expressed goal to manifest Swedish diversity and progressiveness through their own life, personality and views.

The campaign has been widely reported in media around the world and inspired the launch of many similar projects. The Twitter account @PeopleofLeeds started on January 15, 2012, allowing citizens of Leeds to represent their hometown. January 18, 2012, @WeAreAustralia and @TweetWeekUSA, followed by @CuratorsMexico and @BasquesAbroad on January 21. All of these are unofficial accounts without governmental influence or sanctions, unlike @sweden. They have recently been given a concept name of Rotation Curation.

Curators of Sweden was created by the Swedish agency Volontaire. The project won The Golden Egg (Guldägget) on April 17, 2012, received gold in the Clio Awards on May 15, 2012 and was awarded Grand Prix at the Cannes Lions on June 20, 2012.

The project was closed in 2018.

== The block list in 2017 ==
In 2017, the Swedish Institute blocked 14,000 Twitter accounts from interacting with @sweden. Among the blocked were journalists, authors, politicians (some elected members of the Riksdag), businessmen and ambassadors. When the block list was reported in the media, the Swedish Institute lifted the blocks and apologized.

When media, with support from the constitutional Principle of Public Access, asked to review the list of accounts that had been blocked the Swedish Institute deleted the document. The Swedish Institute asked for an external review of the event. The review criticized the institute for blocking the accounts which had been done without regard of the Swedish constitution. The review also heavily criticized the institute for deleting the document in violation of the law.

== See also ==
- The Swedish Number
