= Sälka =

Coordinates: 67°56′N 18°09′E

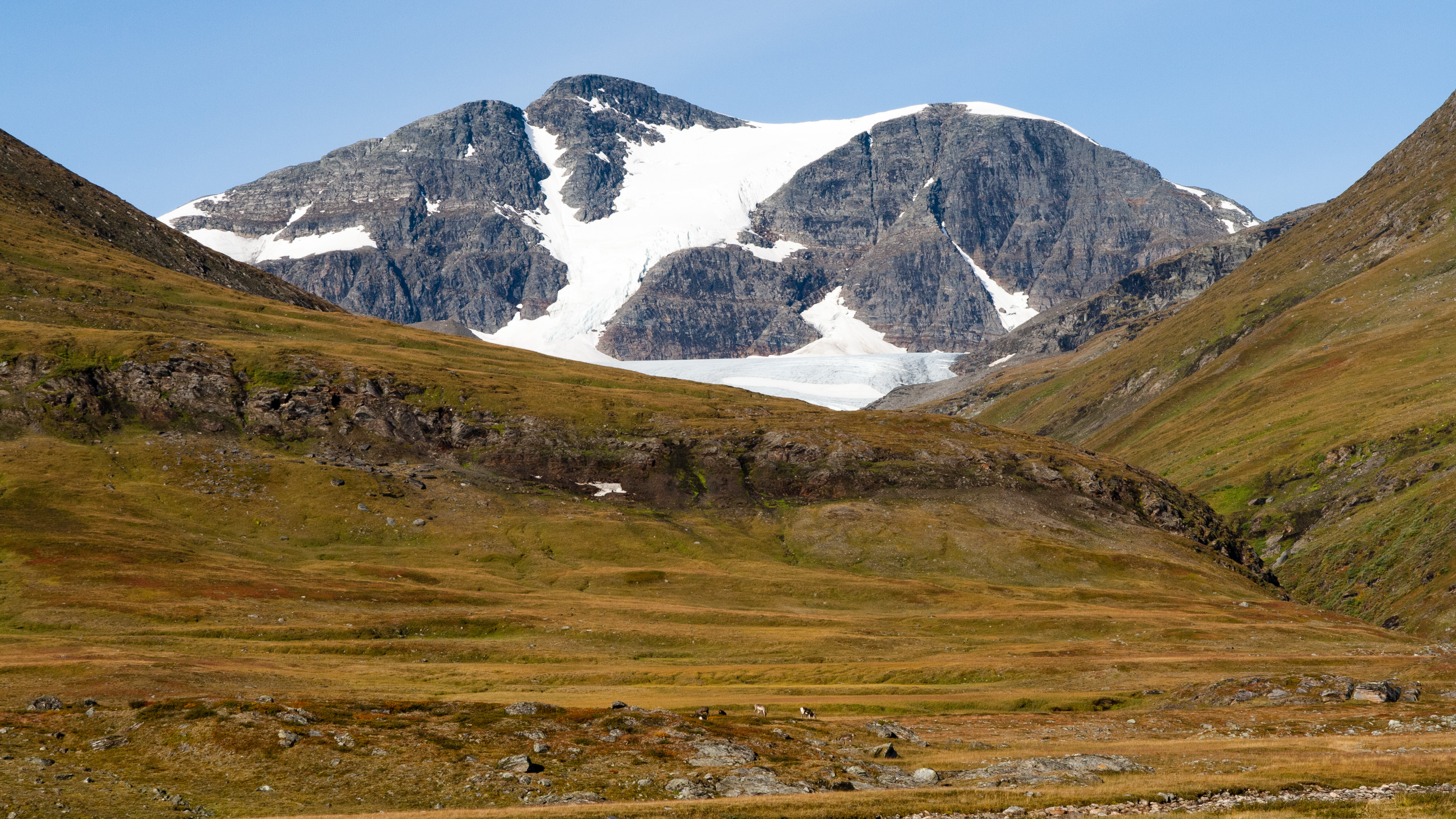
Sälka

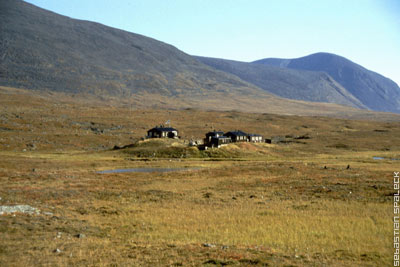
Sälka huts

Sälka (Northern Sami: Sealgga) is a mountain range in the Kebnekaise area, in Kiruna Municipality. The highest peak lies 1865 metres above sea level. East of the range lies Tjäktjavagge valley (Čeakčavággi) where Kungsleden runs. The Swedish Tourist Association (STF) has built some mountain huts in Tjäktjavagge, east of Sälkatoppen.

From Sälkastugorna, the Dürlings led walking routes lead to Kebnekaise.
