= Kebnekaise mountain lodge =

Mountain lodge in Sweden

Coordinates: 67°52′06″N 18°37′15″E

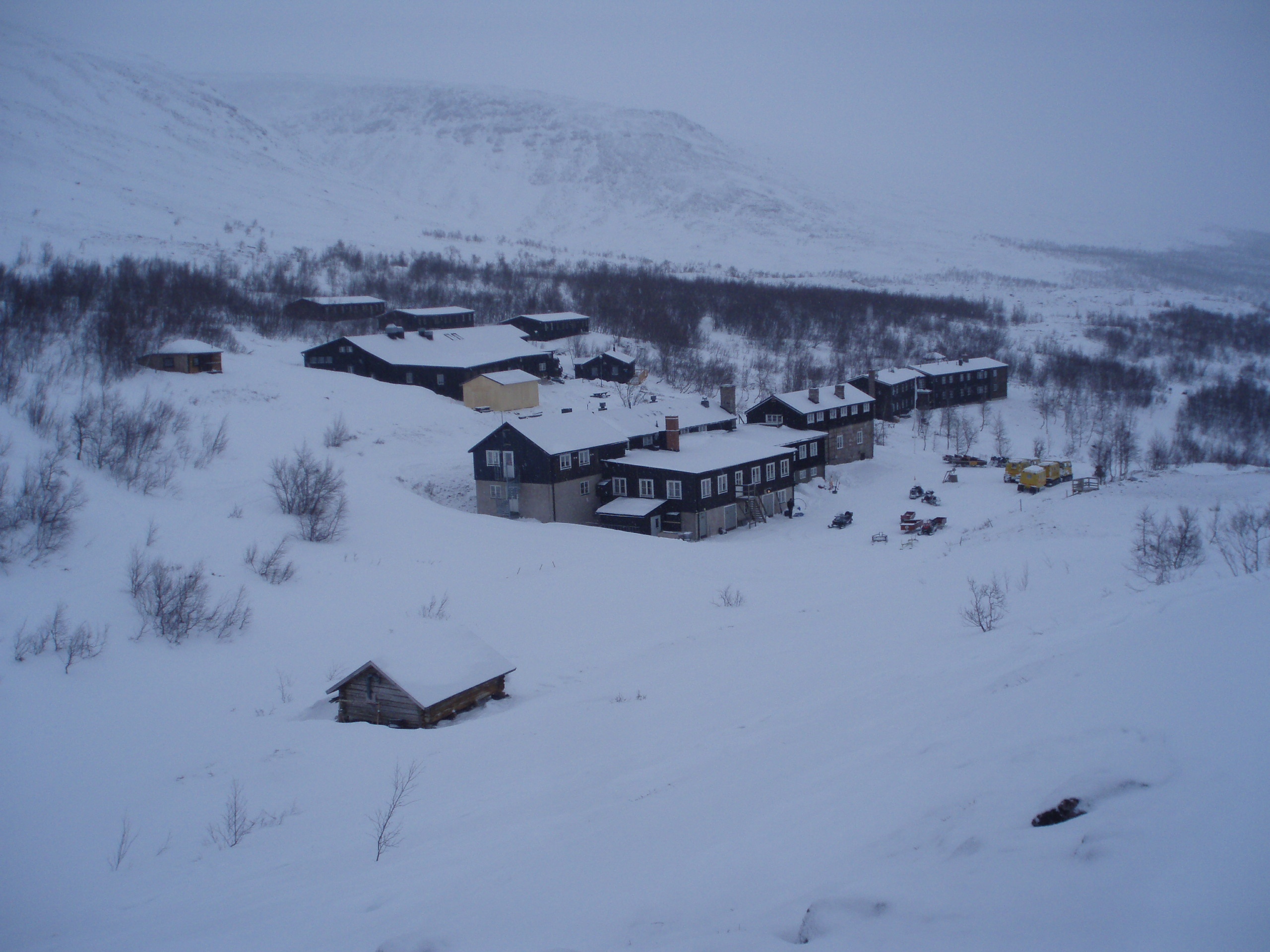
Kebnekaise mountain lodge

Kebnekaise mountain lodge (Kebnekaise fjällstation), elevation 690 metres (2,260 ft), is situated at the base of Mount Kebnekaise, 19 kilometres (12 mi) west of Nikkaluokta, which in turn is situated 66 kilometres (41 mi) west of Kiruna in Lappland, Sweden. The lodge is owned and managed by the Swedish Tourist Association (STF).

== Facilities ==
A restaurant serves a set menu, there is a mountaineering shop, a sauna, showers, rooms and a kiosk. The lodge offers guided tours to the summit of Kebnekaise. The ascent takes roughly 10-12 hours.

The road ends at Nikkaluokta and from there on one has to walk. The walk from Nikkaluokta to Kebnekaise takes approximately 6 h. After 6 kilometres (3.7 mi) there is a restaurant called "Enoks" by the lake Ladtjojaure.

It is also possible to take a helicopter from Nikkaluokta to the Kebnekaise Mountain lodge. The trip takes approximately 10 minutes. Another option to shorten the walk is to take the boat across the lake Ladtjojaure. This saves ca 6 kilometres (3.7 mi) of walking. In the winter (February to April) skiing is the preferred way of getting to the Lodge. Snow mobile rides are synchronized with the buses to Kiruna.

The Swedish Glacier Research body is based in the Tarfala Valley, close to the Kebnekaise Mountain lodge.

== Accommodation ==
There are fewer than 100 beds at the lodge. Booking in advance is recommended. There is plenty of space for tents, although camping is not allowed within 150 metres (490 ft) from the buildings. No booking of tents needed, though a service fee may apply if campers wish to use any facilities at the lodge.

== Maps ==
The mountain map features: BD6, BD8, and Högfjällskarta Kebnekaise.

== Gallery ==
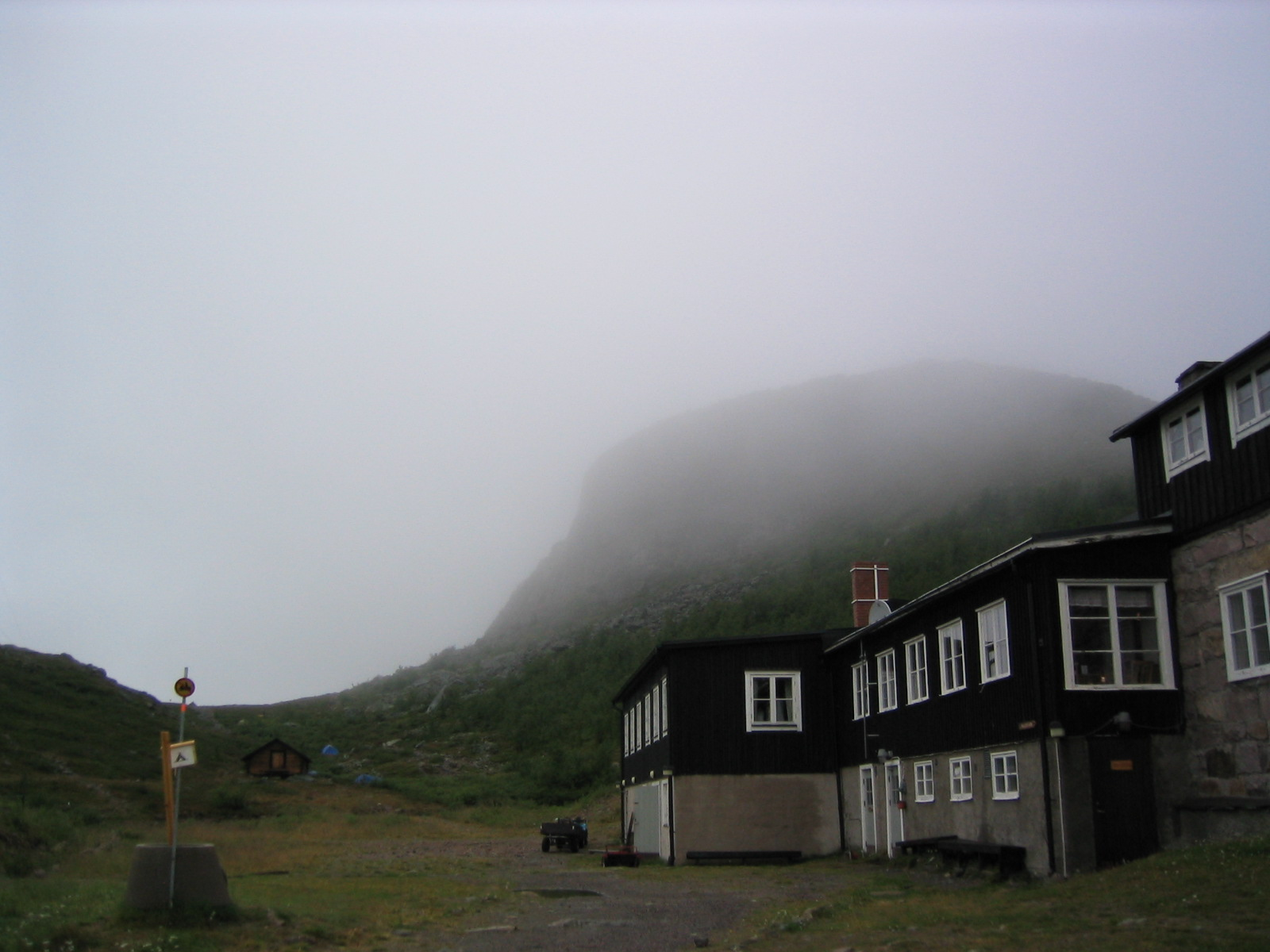
The Kebnekaise Mountain lodge

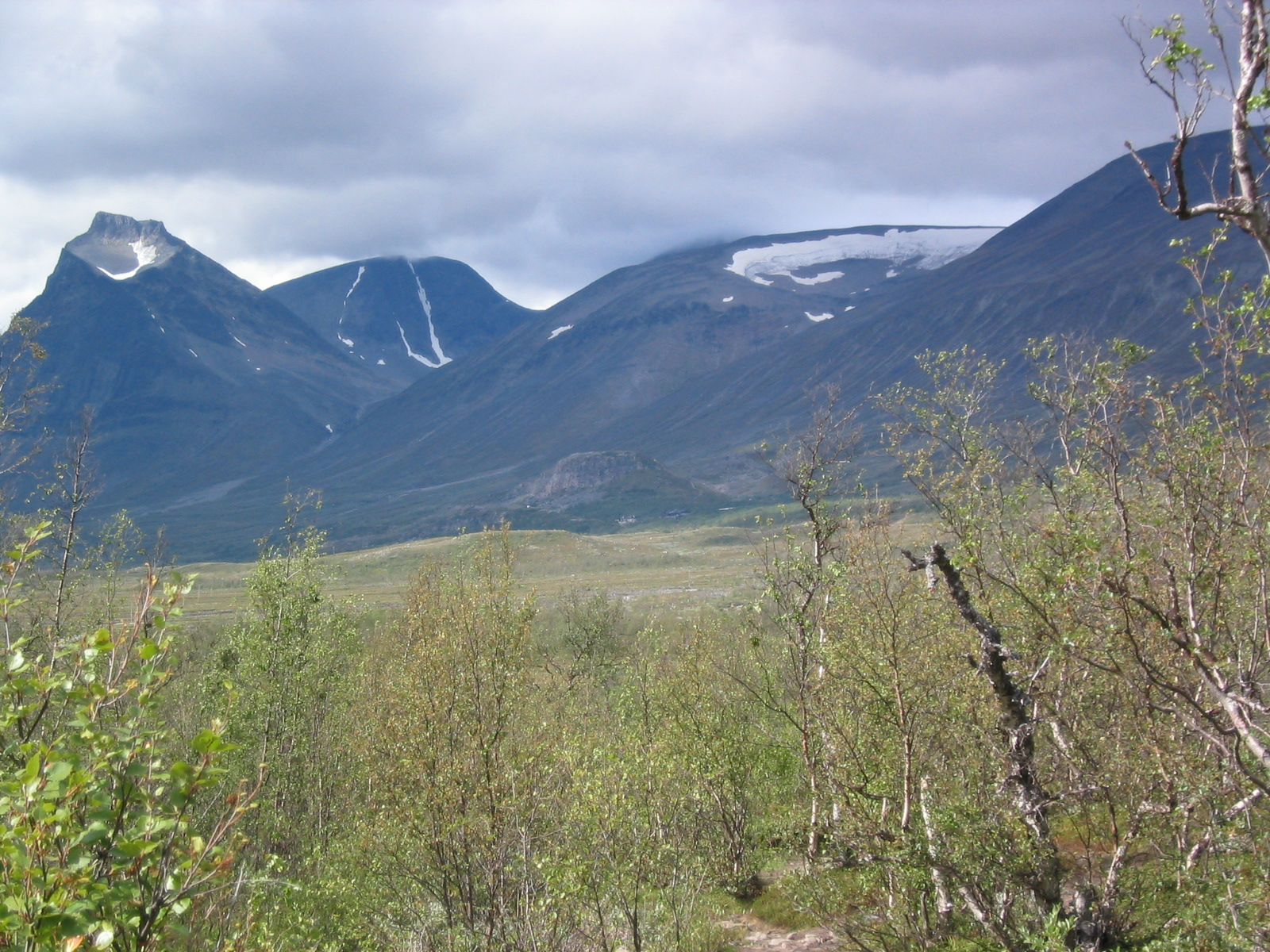
The track leading to the lodge
