= Vierranvárri =

Mountain in Sweden

Coordinates: 67°52′56″N 18°29′49″E

Vierranvárri is a mountain situated between Duolbagorni and Giebmegáisi (Kebnekaise) in Lapland in northern Sweden.

The western trail to the summit of Giebmegáisi goes right over Vierranvárri, so hikers choosing that route lose 200 meters in altitude before starting to mount the actual Giebmegáisi massif.

Vierranvárri was previously also known as Rullevare – a play on the scree making up the slopes of the mountain (from Swedish rulla "roll" and Sámi várri/várre "mountain").
