= Kvikkjokk =

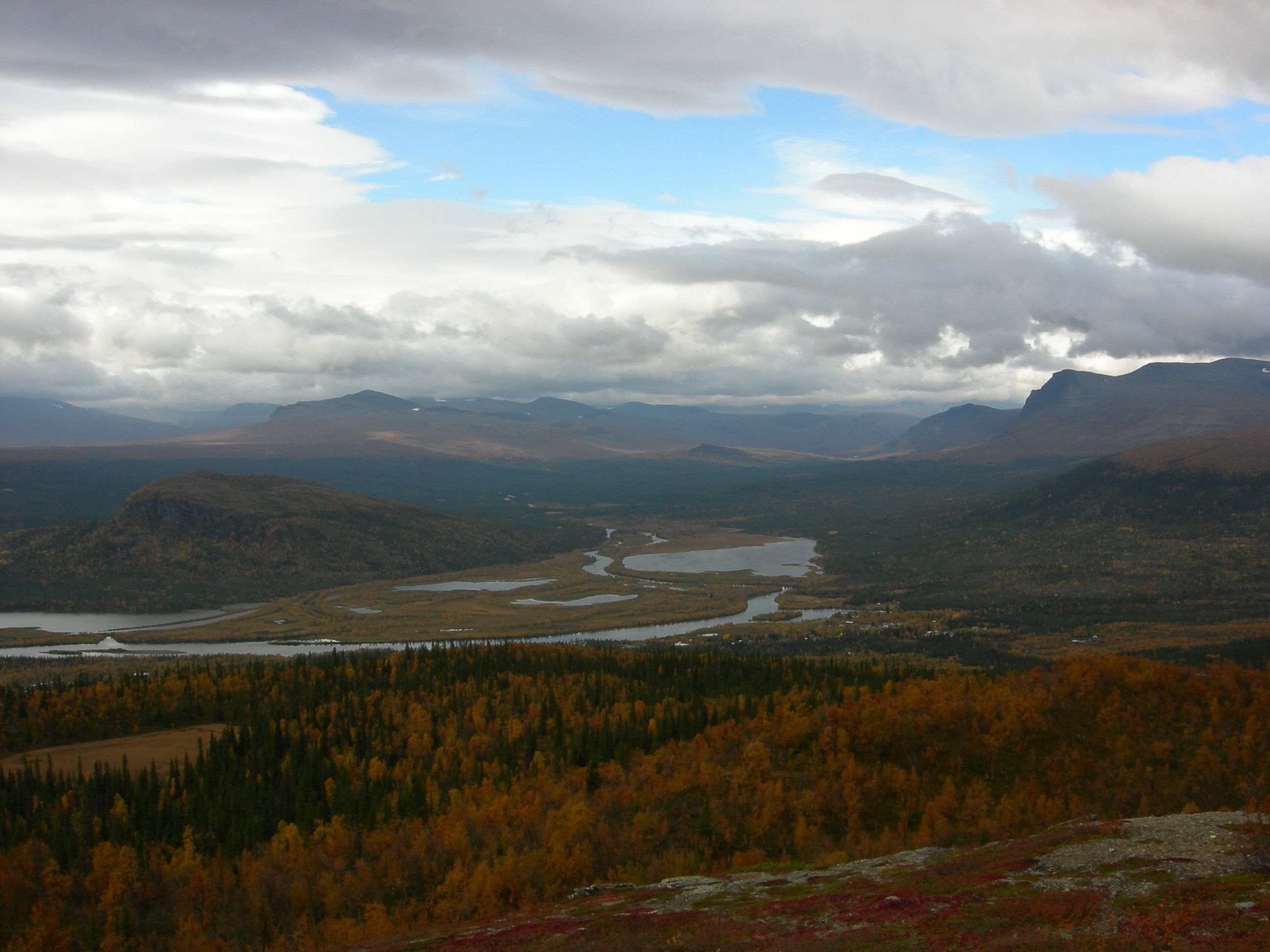

- Location within Norrbotten Location within Sweden
- Coordinates: 66°57′N 17°43′E
- Country: Sweden
- Province: Lapland
- County: Norrbotten County
- Municipality: Jokkmokk Municipality

Population (2007)
  - Total: 16
- Time zone: UTC+1 (CET)
  - Summer (DST): UTC+2 (CEST)

Kvikkjokk (Swedish pronunciation: [ˈkvɪ̌kːjɔk]) (Lule Sámi: Huhttán) is a small village situated in Jokkmokk Municipality, Norrbotten County, Sweden. It is located 120 km northwest of Jokkmokk. Several hiking trails start in Kvikkjokk. Kungsleden passes through the village and it is a popular starting point for hikers going into Sarek National Park.

== Etymology ==
The name derives from the Lule Sámi Kuoi'hka-johko "gushing river" which is another name for the river Gamájåhkå ("river as murky as reindeer milk's whey"). The modern Sámi name Huhttán derives from the ore smelting hut which once stood in the village, the Swedish word for 'the hut' being hyttan.

== History ==
The Kvikkjokk area is traditionally Sámi. The first Swedish settlement in the area came after 1659 when it became known that silver was present in the nearby mountain Silbbatjåhkkå (Kedkevare). The first smelting began in 1662 and in 1672 mining was expanded also to the mountain Álggávárre (Alkavare). The mines and huts were collectively known as Luleå Silververk (Luleå Silverworks). The settlement steadily grew until 1702 when production stopped, leading to the vast majority of the Swedish population leaving the settlement. Left were only the priest and bell-ringer. Only near the end of the 1700s did any new settlers begin coming me to the area.

== Climate ==
Kvikkjokk has a subarctic climate (Köppen Dfc). It is one of the most continental climates of the Nordics, with 20 °C (68 °F) summer highs and −20 °C (−4 °F) winter lows in terms of averages. Areas to its north that share the proximity to the Norwegian border have greater maritime moderation with milder winters and quite a bit cooler summers. Kvikkjokk instead is quite reminiscent of Lapland's largest town Kiruna in terms of climate, only with wider temperature swings. The record low temperature of −43.6 °C (−46.5 °F) was registered on 3 January 2024.

Climate data for Kvikkjokk–Årrenjarka (2002–2022 averages); extremes since 1901
Month	Jan	Feb	Mar	Apr	May	Jun	Jul	Aug	Sep	Oct	Nov	Dec	Year
Record high °C (°F)	9.0 (48.2)	9.0 (48.2)	12.0 (53.6)	17.4 (63.3)	27.2 (81.0)	30.9 (87.6)	33.1 (91.6)	29.1 (84.4)	24.2 (75.6)	16.0 (60.8)	12.8 (55.0)	9.5 (49.1)	33.1 (91.6)
Mean maximum °C (°F)	3.9 (39.0)	5.4 (41.7)	7.2 (45.0)	12.1 (53.8)	20.3 (68.5)	25.2 (77.4)	26.9 (80.4)	24.8 (76.6)	18.4 (65.1)	11.5 (52.7)	5.7 (42.3)	4.7 (40.5)	28.3 (82.9)
Mean daily maximum °C (°F)	−10.0 (14.0)	−7.2 (19.0)	−0.8 (30.6)	5.0 (41.0)	10.7 (51.3)	16.8 (62.2)	20.1 (68.2)	17.6 (63.7)	11.6 (52.9)	4.0 (39.2)	−3.4 (25.9)	−6.4 (20.5)	4.8 (40.7)
Daily mean °C (°F)	−14.9 (5.2)	−12.7 (9.1)	−6.8 (19.8)	−0.4 (31.3)	5.2 (41.4)	11.0 (51.8)	14.3 (57.7)	12.0 (53.6)	7.0 (44.6)	0.2 (32.4)	−7.1 (19.2)	−11.3 (11.7)	−0.3 (31.5)
Mean daily minimum °C (°F)	−20.0 (−4.0)	−18.1 (−0.6)	−12.9 (8.8)	−5.8 (21.6)	−0.4 (31.3)	5.1 (41.2)	8.5 (47.3)	6.4 (43.5)	2.4 (36.3)	−3.6 (25.5)	−10.8 (12.6)	−16.1 (3.0)	−5.4 (22.2)
Mean minimum °C (°F)	−35.1 (−31.2)	−34.5 (−30.1)	−29.0 (−20.2)	−19.4 (−2.9)	−7.1 (19.2)	−2.0 (28.4)	1.3 (34.3)	−0.9 (30.4)	−5.0 (23.0)	−14.3 (6.3)	−23.8 (−10.8)	−30.8 (−23.4)	−37.6 (−35.7)
Record low °C (°F)	−43.6 (−46.5)	−42.5 (−44.5)	−39.0 (−38.2)	−30.0 (−22.0)	−19.0 (−2.2)	−6.6 (20.1)	−3.0 (26.6)	−4.5 (23.9)	−10.5 (13.1)	−25.6 (−14.1)	−35.7 (−32.3)	−40.4 (−40.7)	−43.6 (−46.5)
Average precipitation mm (inches)	42.7 (1.68)	35.1 (1.38)	24.1 (0.95)	22.2 (0.87)	41.1 (1.62)	54.2 (2.13)	90.2 (3.55)	71.7 (2.82)	59.1 (2.33)	45.4 (1.79)	42.6 (1.68)	49.2 (1.94)	577.6 (22.74)
Average extreme snow depth cm (inches)	75 (30)	89 (35)	85 (33)	76 (30)	36 (14)	0 (0)	0 (0)	0 (0)	0 (0)	11 (4.3)	33 (13)	59 (23)	95 (37)
Source 1: SMHI Open Data
Source 2: SMHI climate data 2002–2022

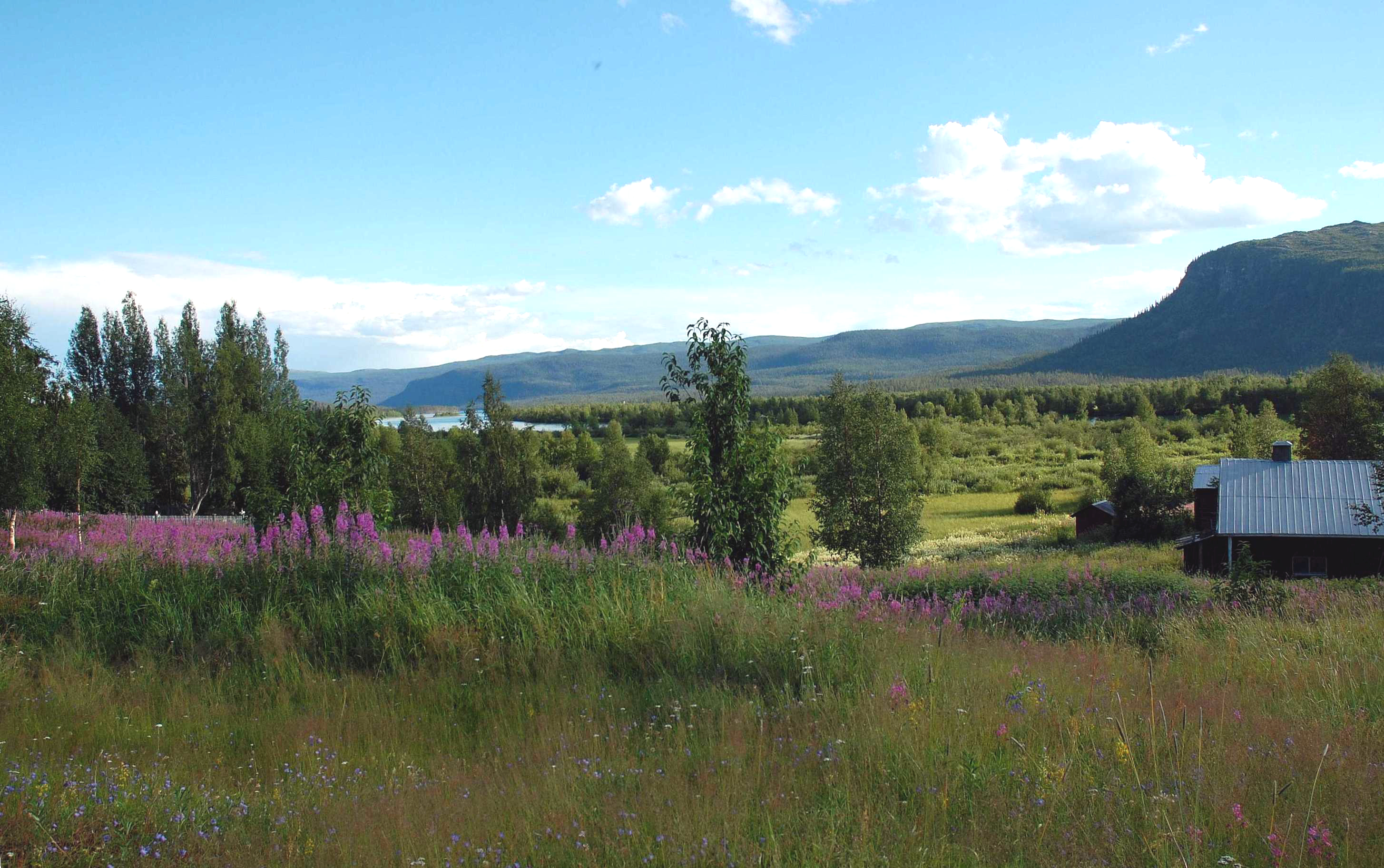
View from Kvikkjokk

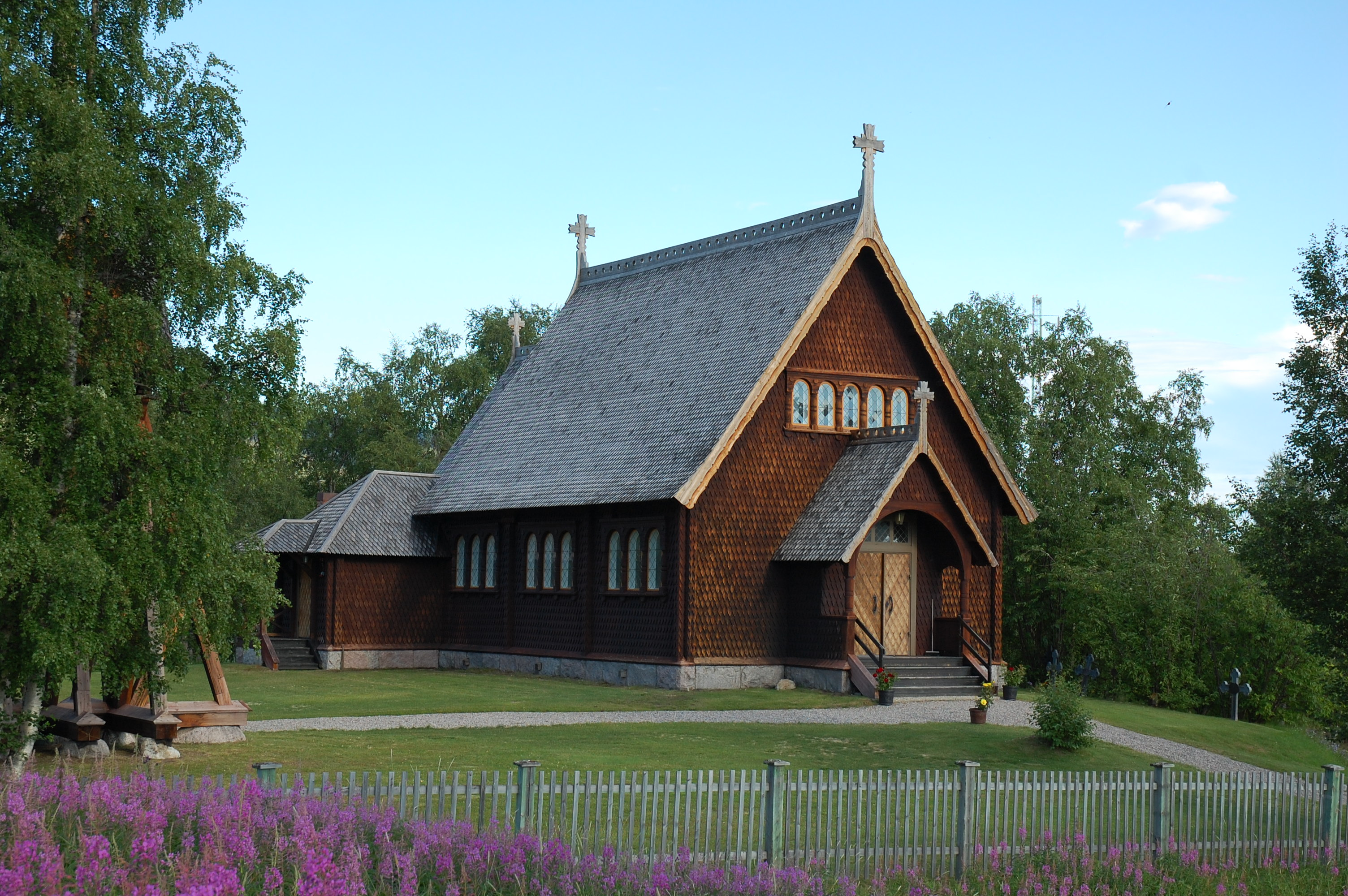
Kvikkjokk church
