= Kungsleden =

Hiking trail in Sweden

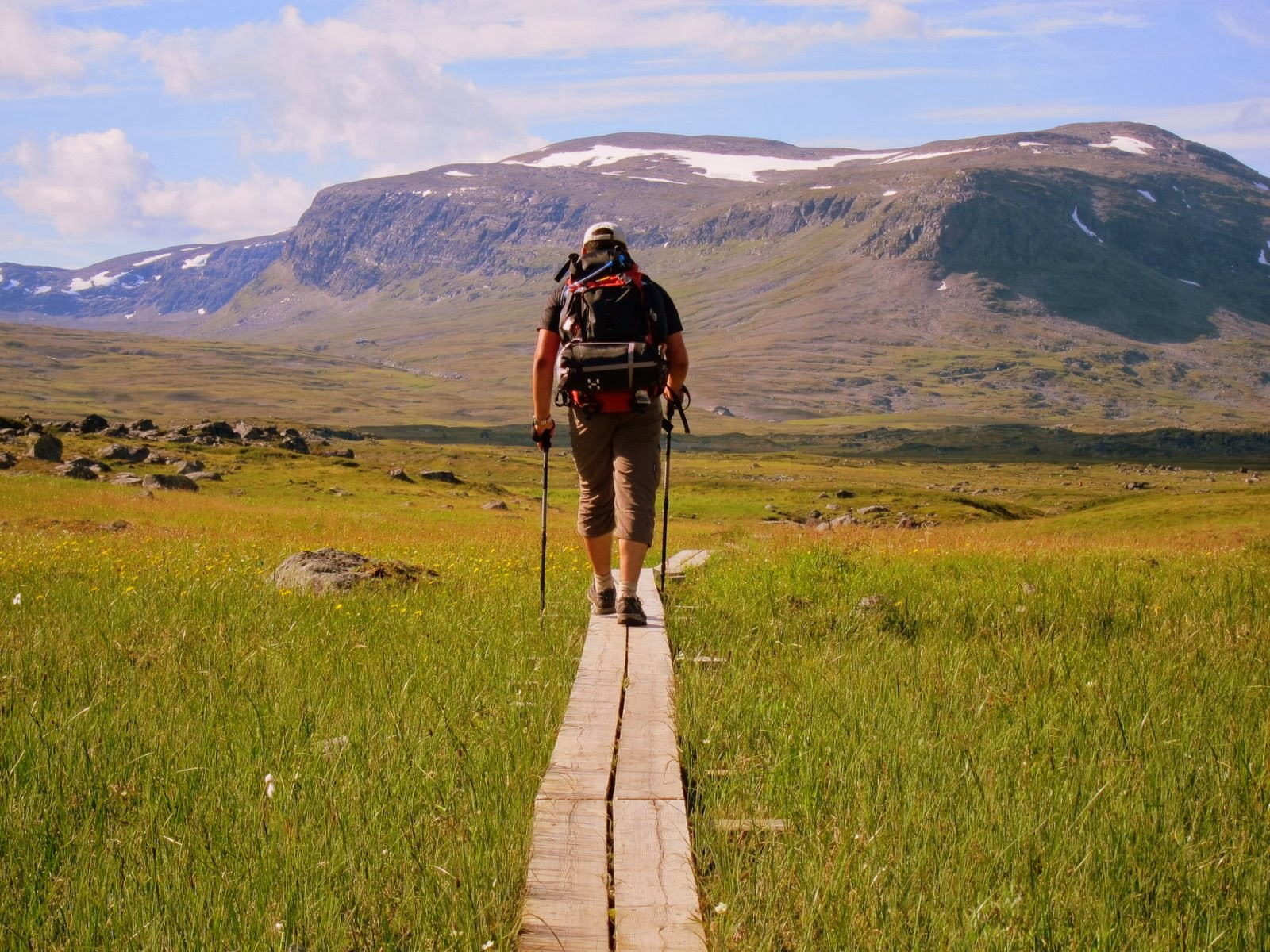
- The Kungsleden trail between Alesjaure and Tjäktja huts
- Length: 467 kilometres (290 mi) approximately
- Location: Lapland, Sweden
- Trailheads: Abisko/Hemavan
- Use: Hiking
- Highest point: Tjäktjapasset, 1,150 m (3,770 ft)
- Lowest point: Kvikkjokk, 305 m (1,001 ft)
- Difficulty: Moderate
- Season: Summer to early autumn
- Months: May to September
- Sights: Mt Kebnekaise, Lapporten, Abisko, Sarek National Park

Kungsleden (King's Trail) is a hiking trail in northern Sweden, approximately 467 kilometres (290 mi) long, between Abisko in the north and Hemavan in the south. The full distance breaks down into 419.3 km of trekking, 18.2 km of lake crossings and a 29.5 km stretch of road, almost all of which hikers cover by bus. It passes through, near the southern end, the Vindelfjällen Nature Reserve, one of the largest protected areas in Europe. In the winter Kungsleden is a ski trail with approximately the same route.

== History ==
The history of Kungsleden is connected to the Swedish Tourism Association (Svenska Turistföreningen or STF). This association was formed in 1885 by scientists at Uppsala in order to facilitate access to Swedish mountains. From the late nineteenth century, the association had the idea of creating a royal road through the mountains in Swedish Lapland. The proposed route was to link the present-day Abisko to Kvikkjokk. Construction of the Malmbanan railway line between Kiruna and Narvik in 1902 gave this project the required access. STF bought three officer cabins from the Swedish Railways including one at Abisko. With the very limited funds available, it gradually transformed the cabin at Abisko into a tourism station. It also built chalets: the first ones being those of Abiskojaure and Kebnekaise in 1907. Between Abisko and Abiskojaure, the trail followed an old road used to transport materials. In addition to the cottages, the association brought in boats for the lakes between Abisko and Vakkotavare.

For the section between Vakkotavare and Kvikkjokk, the initial project was to take the trail through the middle of Sarek National Park, with a cottage near the Rapa River, crossing which would require a boat. The plans were later changed, such that the trail runs along the eastern end of park instead.

Initially, the trail was not marked or named. In 1920, in a book on Kebnekaise, the trail appeared under the name Alesvaggeleden. The trail between Abisko and Vakkotavare was finally marked in 1926 and 1927. In 1928, without any ceremony or inauguration the name Kungsleden appeared for the first time, with the opening of the Kvikkjokk station. The construction of the cottages was slow given the limited economic means of association. There was still no proper path to speak of and the public sentiment for the trail was very limited at first, but it quickly grew in popularity.

The trail was extended in a relatively discrete way. In 1941, the Kungsleden went from Abisko to Jäkkvik and early 1950s, it reached up to Ammarnäs. Some hikers at the time included Kungsleden in all STF trail networks in the mountains, from the three-Country Cairn in the north to Grövelsjön in the south. In 1975, the trail was officially extended to Hemavan with the creation of the Vindelfjällen Nature Reserve. The section further south (between Sälen and Storlien) however, is sometimes called Södra Kungsleden (literally Southern Kungsleden).

== The trail ==
Kungsleden runs for about 467 kilometres (290 mi) between Abisko in the north and Hemavan in the south. The trail is well-marked and many sections are well equipped and maintained by the Countyboard of Norrbotten (Länsstyrelsen i Norrbotten), with plank walkways covering swampy or rocky ground. However, other sections, further from the trailheads, are eroded and rocky, increasing the difficulty of hiking. There are bridges across non-fordable streams and during the summer season lakes and rivers could be crossed either with rowing boats provided by Countyboard of Norrbotten or STF or by taking a local charter boat. The winter trail takes a somewhat different course in locations where it runs over swamps or lakes that can not be negotiated in summer.

The trail is separated into four sections, each representing approximately one week of hiking. The most popular part is by far the northernmost section, between Abisko and Kebnekaise. The season, when the huts are open, usually runs between mid-June and the end of September. Rowing boats are usually in place at the end of June or beginning of July, but the weather can be very treacherous, including late or early snow. The winter season runs from mid-February to the end of April.

== Huts ==
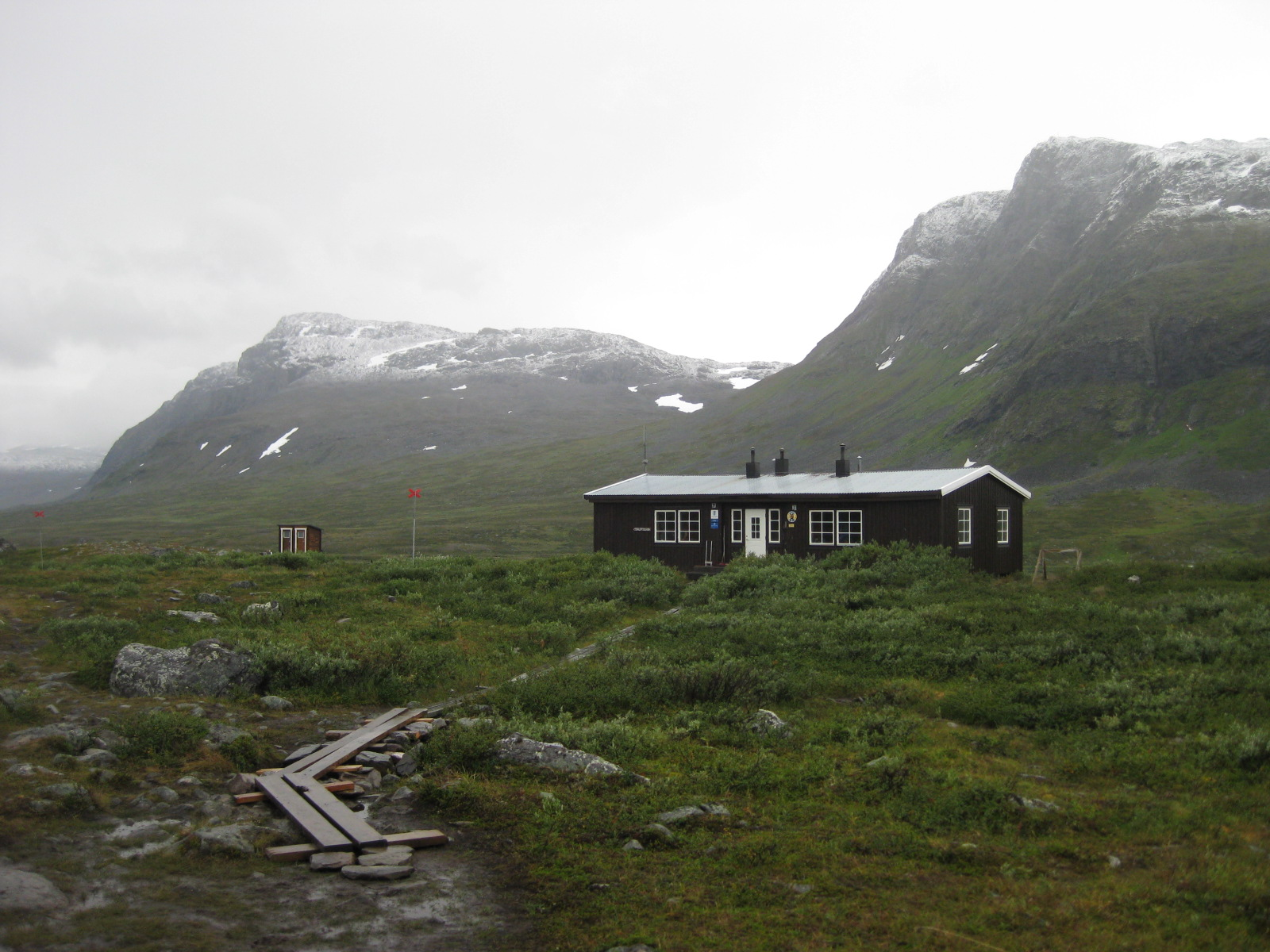
Singi hut, the northern section of Kungsleden

Huts have been constructed along the trail, separated by a distance that a walker could expect to cover during the day, about 9–22 kilometres (5.6–13.7 mi). The huts are primarily operated by STF and provide a mattress, pillow, blanket and simple cooking facilities. For a small fee, it is possible to pitch a tent outside and use the facilities of the huts. Supplies can be bought in some of them (Alesjaure and Kebnekaise Fjällstation, for example). Some emergency shelters can also be found on the route.

The huts along Kungsleden are (from north to south):

- Abisko
- Abiskojaure
- Alesjaure
- Tjäktja
- Sälka
- Singi
- Kaitumjaure
- Teusajaure
- Vakkotavare
- Saltoluokta
- Sitojaure
- Aktse
- Pårte
- Kvikkjokk
- Ammarnäs
- Aigert
- Serve
- Tärnasjö
- Syter
- Viterskalet
- Hemavan

There are no huts between Kvikkjokk and Ammarnäs which is about a 130 kilometres (81 mi) section of the Kungsleden.

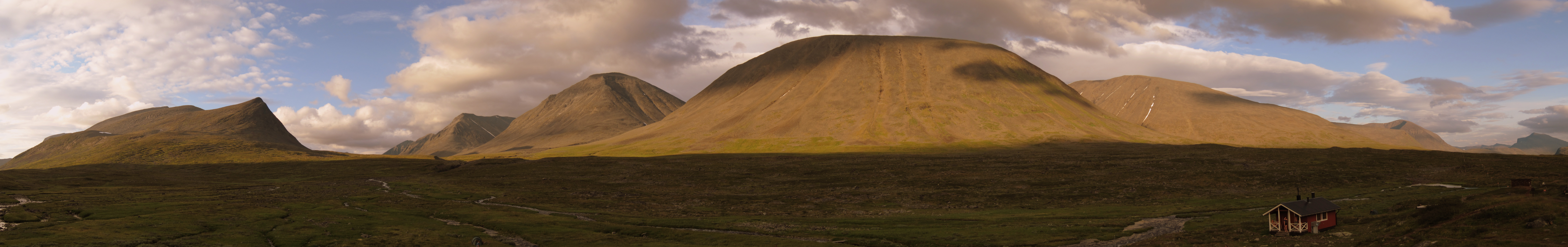
Panoramic view from the Sälka hut on the Kungsleden trail

== Map ==
An overview map of Kungsleden.

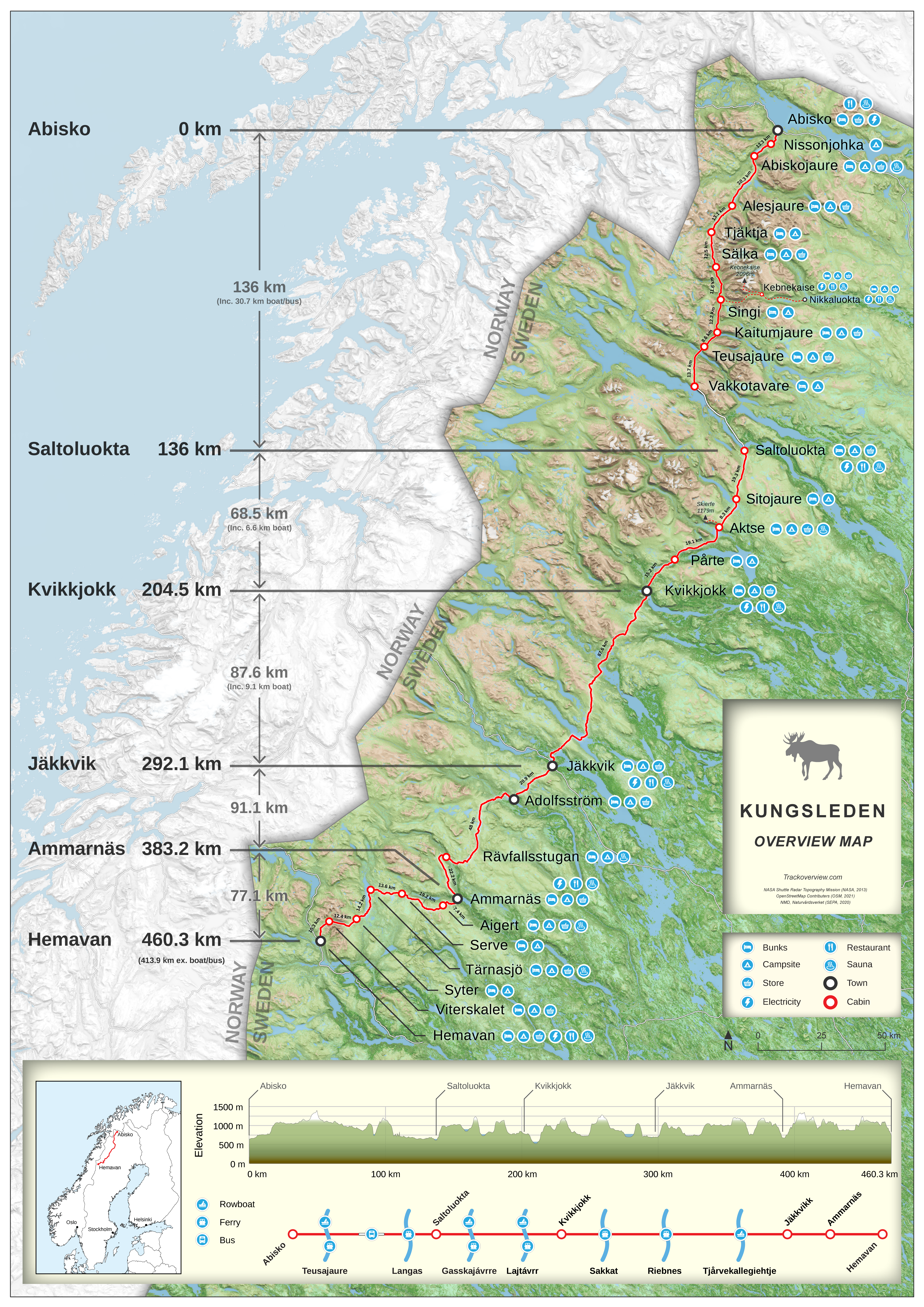
An overview map showing the route, distances and amenities.

== Sights ==
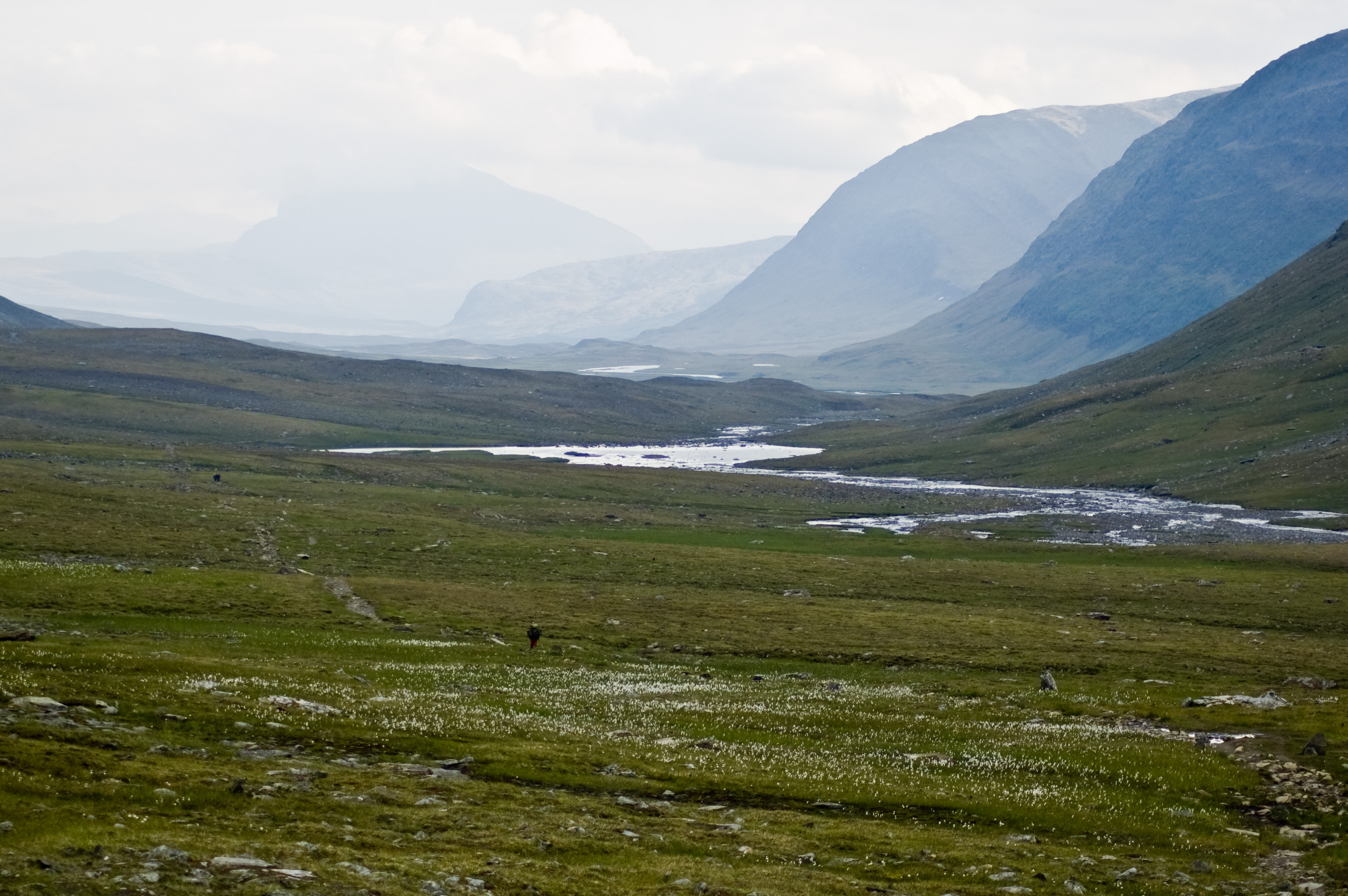
The trail seen from its highest point, Tjäktja pass

Highlights along the way, sometimes a small detour is needed, are: Abisko: Hostel / mountain station, hiking during summer, back-country skiing during winter. From here, it's possible to get to Nikkaluokta via dog-sledging tours during the winter.

- Kebnekaise: Sweden's highest mountain, 2,097 metres (6,880 ft), and centre of Swedish alpinism, with the lodge (Kebnekaise Fjällstation) at its foot.
- Sarek National Park: Part of the World Heritage Site Laponia. No roads, tracks or bridges makes this a terrain for experienced hikers.
- Kvikkjokk: Old mountain farming village and hostel.
- Hemavan and Tärnaby: Small towns/villages with hiking possibilities in the summer, and back-country skiing possibilities in the winter. Native village of alpine skiers Ingemar Stenmark and Anja Pärson.

== Access ==
Access to Abisko is by direct train from Gothenburg, Stockholm, or Narvik. Abisko can also be reached by bus either from Kiruna or from Narvik, which can be reached by regular air traffic.

Hemavan is easily accessible by car or bus from Umeå or Mo i Rana in Norway. Some buses only run during the summer season. The Hemavan Tärnaby Airport is the closest airport to the reserve and has one flight per day, 6 days per week, to and from Stockholm-Arlanda, with a flight time of 1.25 hours.

A few places along the trail can be reached by road or public transport (a few others can also be reached by boat charter services).

- Nikkaluokta, about 33 kilometres (21 mi) off the trail and 20 kilometres (12 mi) from Kebnekaise can be reached by bus or car from Kiruna.
- Suorva and Kebnats can be reached by bus or car from Gällivare.
- Kvikkjokk can be reached by bus or car from Jokkmokk.
- Jäckvik (Jäkkvik) can be reached by bus or car from Umeå, Arvidsjaur or Fauske in Norway.
- Adolfström can be reached by bus or car from Arjeplog.
- Ammarnäs can be reached by bus or car from Sorsele.

During the summer Jokkmokk, Arvidsjaur and Sorsele are reachable by The Inland Line tourist railway.

== Records ==
In recent years, a number of trail running athletes have been attempting to set the fastest known time. The female speed record is currently held by the Swedish athlete Emelie Forsberg. The Belgian adventurer Louis-Philippe Loncke achieved the distinction of being the first person to complete the entire trail on foot with packrafting and unsupported, climbing underway also Skierfe and the Kebnekaise North and South summits.
