= Swedish Tourist Association =

Swedish nonprofit organization

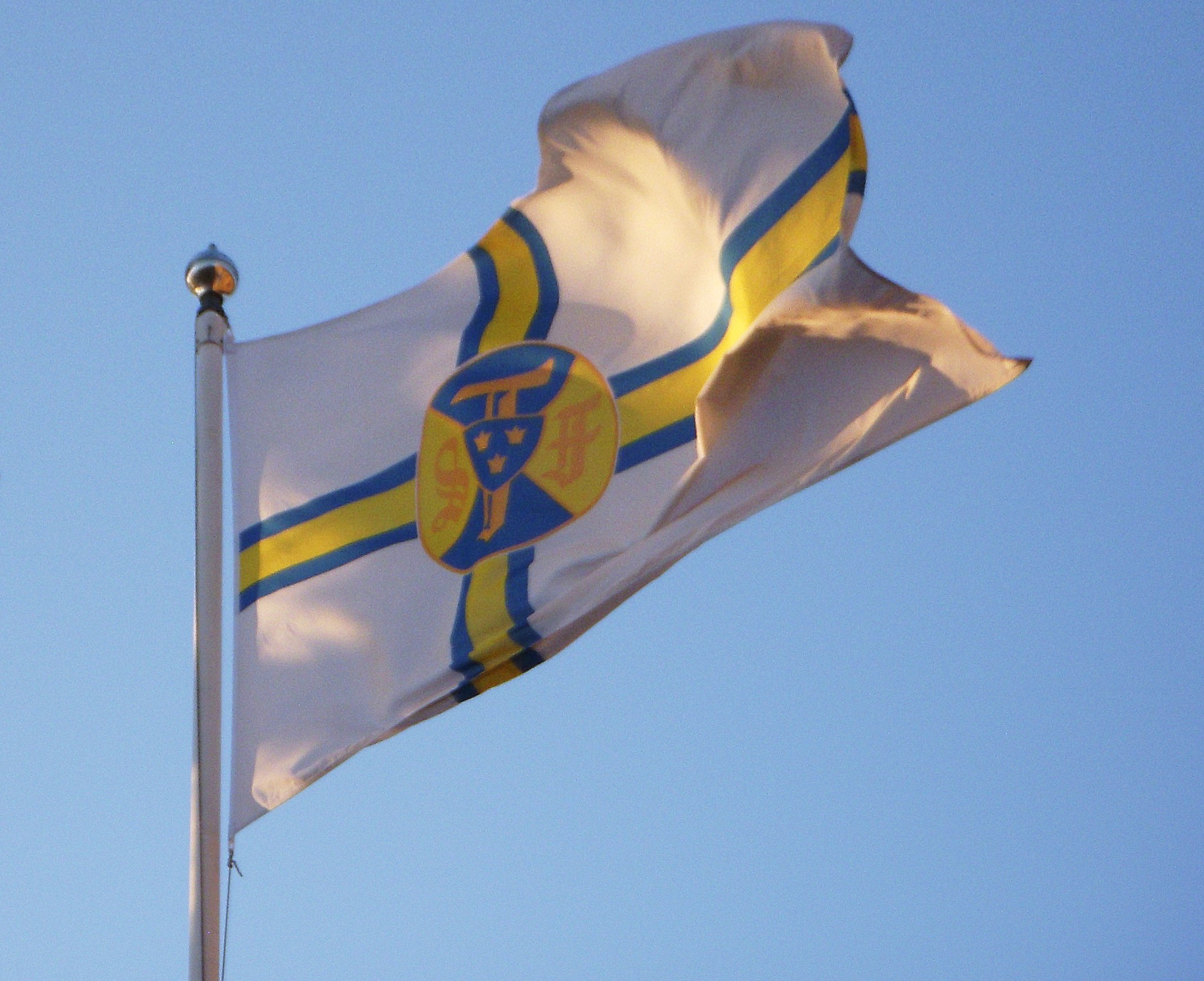
Swedish Tourist Association flag

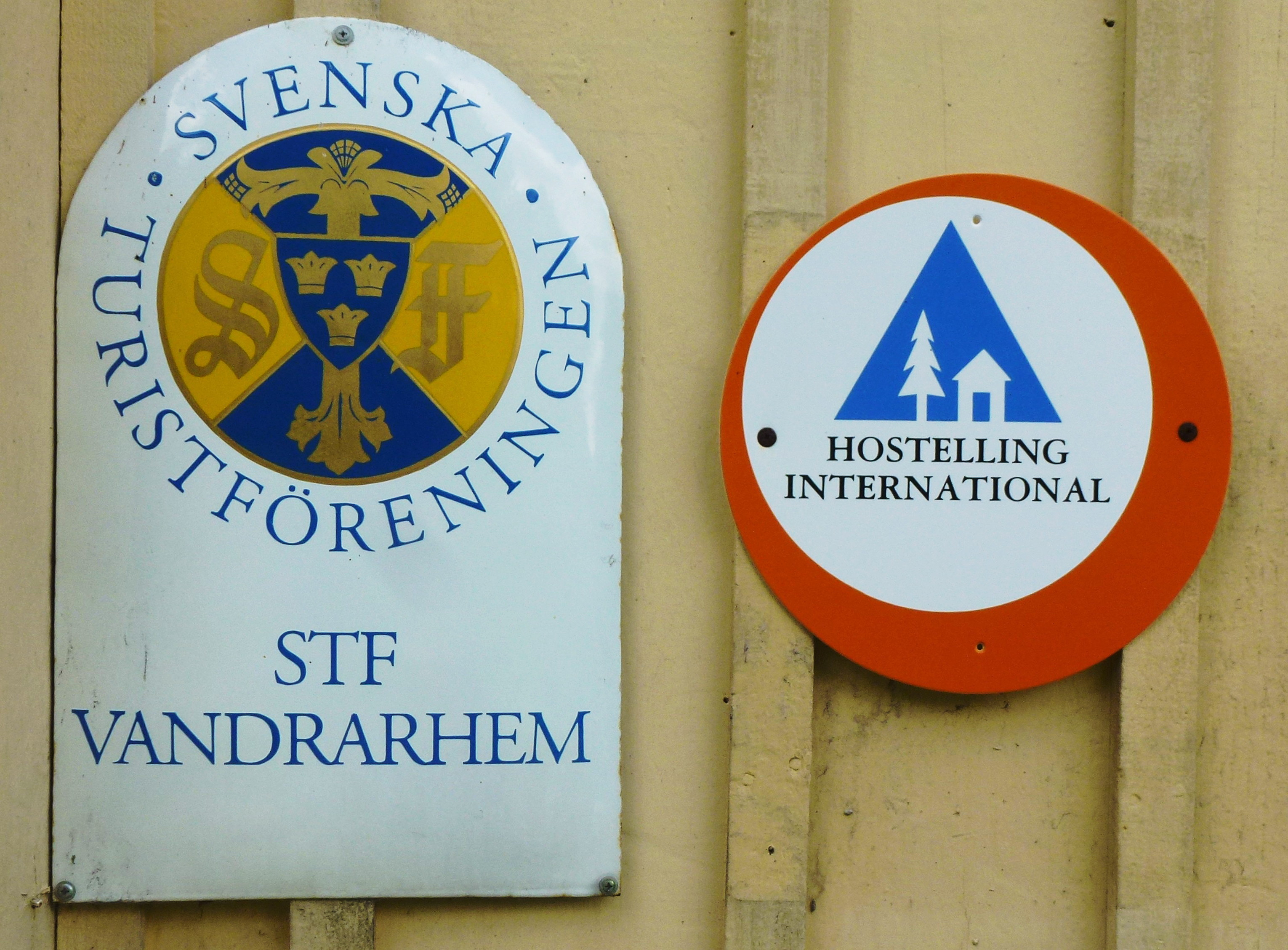
STF's sign on a hostel

The Swedish Tourist Association (Swedish: Svenska Turistföreningen, pronounced [ˈsvɛ̂nːska tʉˈrɪ̂stfœrˌeːnɪŋɛn]; abbreviated STF), founded in 1885, aims at promoting outdoor life and knowledge among the Swedes about their country.

The Association maintains a variety of trails, huts and hostels in different parts of Sweden. It became known for the creation of Kungsleden, a 440 kilometer long hiking trail in Lapland, through one of Europe's largest remaining wilderness areas.

The association has approximately 300,000 members, employing about 500 people of which 400 for seasonal work, for instance as landlords for 45 fell huts and 10 larger fell hostels.

Dag Hammarskjöld was one of the association's most prominent leaders. When becoming the Secretary-General of the United Nations, the only remaining duties Hammarskjöld kept in Sweden were those associated with his vice-chairmanship of the STF and as required by his membership of the Swedish Academy. Backåkra, the farm which Hammarskjöld acquired in 1957, is, in accordance to his will, maintained by the STF; a part of the farm serves as a retreat center for the members of the STF.

== See also ==
- The Swedish Number
