= Swedish Institute =

Swedish government agency

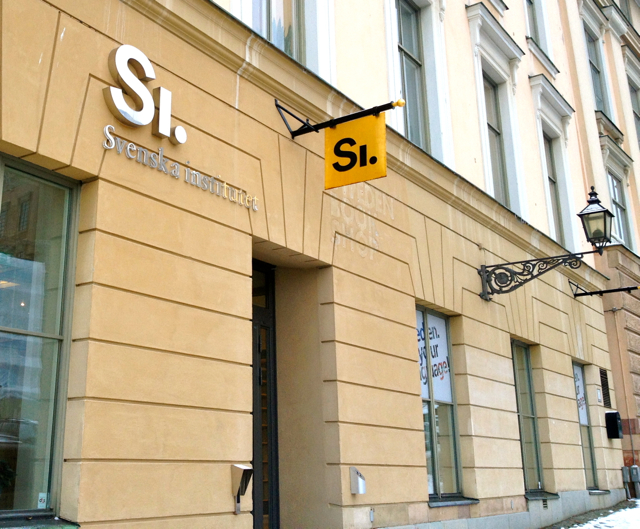
- Former office on Slottsbacken
- Type: Government agency
- Region served: Worldwide
- Product: Swedish cultural education
- Parent organization: Swedish Ministry for Foreign Affairs

The Swedish Institute (Swedish: Svenska institutet, SI) is a government agency in Sweden with the responsibility to spread information about Sweden outside the country. It exists to promote Swedish interests, and to organise exchanges with other countries in different areas of public life, in particular in the spheres of culture, education, and research.

The main office of the Swedish Institute is located in Hammarby Sjöstad in Stockholm. There is also a branch abroad; the Swedish Cultural Centre in Paris (French: Centre Culturel Suédois). The agency has approximately 140 members of staff and its board is appointed by the Government of Sweden.

In early 2007 the Swedish Institute stated it was planning to set up an "embassy", the "House of Sweden", in Second Life, an Internet-based virtual world. This virtual office is not intended to provide passports or visas, but serve as a point of information about Sweden.

Other Swedish embassies in foreign countries are under the direct authority and control of the Swedish Ministry for Foreign Affairs.

== Projects ==
=== The Twitter account @sweden ===
The Swedish Institute is responsible for running the Twitter account @Sweden.

From 2011 to 2018 the account was the location of the Curators of Sweden project, where a new "curator" was selected to tweet from the account each week.

In 2017, SI blocked 14,000 Twitter accounts from interacting with @Sweden. Among the blocked were journalists, authors, politicians, businessmen and ambassadors. When the block list was reported in the media, SI lifted the blocks and apologized.

When media, with support from the constitutional Principle of Public Access, asked to review the list of blocked accounts the government agency deleted it.

=== The Swedish Number ===
The Swedish Institute was one of the four associations involved in the development of The Swedish Number.

== See also ==
- Swedish Institute Alexandria
- Cultural Diplomacy
- Public diplomacy
- British Council
- Alliance Française
