= Nikkaluokta =

Village in Gällivare, Norrbotten, Sweden

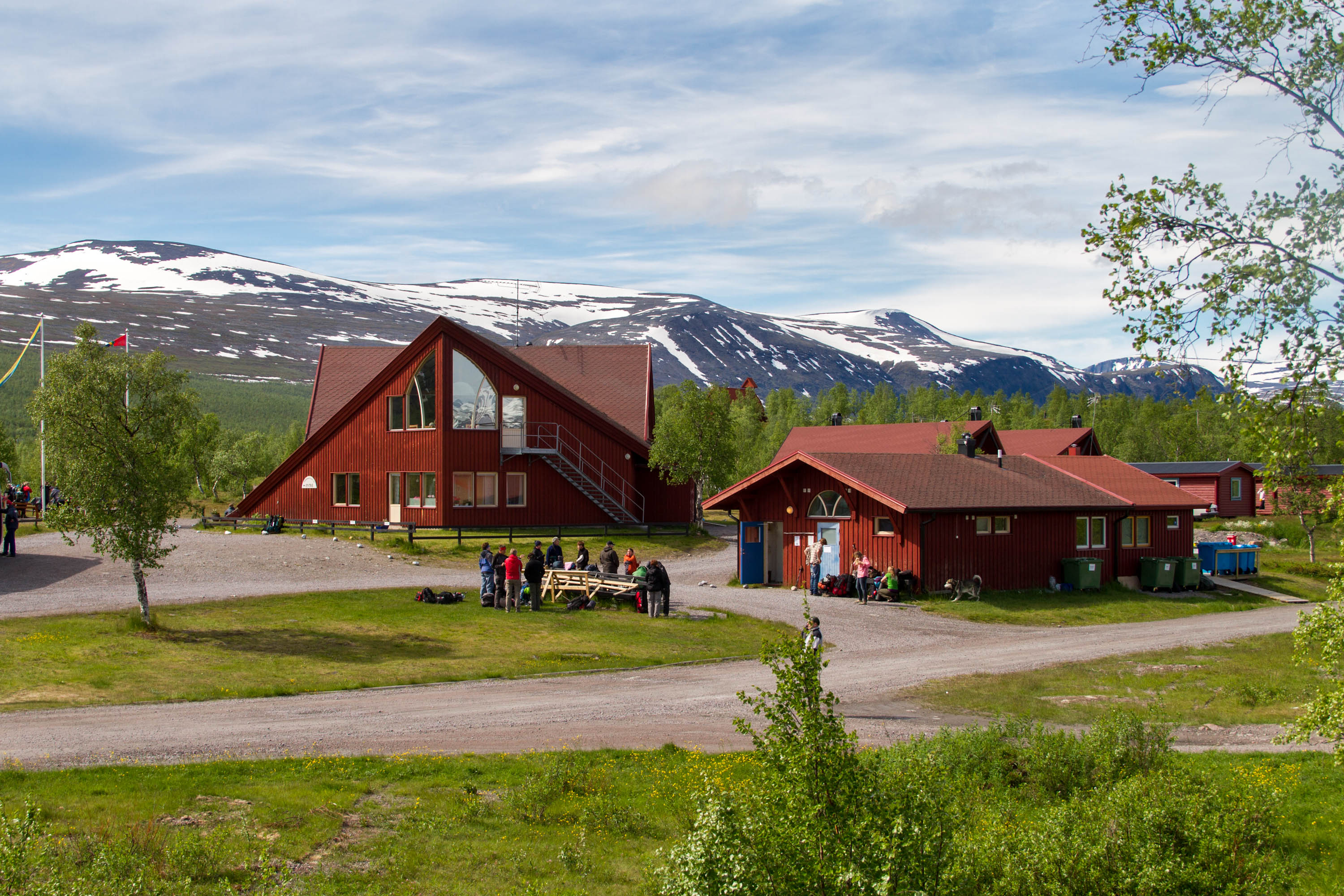
- Nikkaluokta mountain lodge

- Location within Norrbotten Location within Sweden
- Coordinates: 67°51′4″N 19°01′30″E
- Country: Sweden
- Municipality: Gällivare Municipality
- County: Norrbotten County
- Province: Lappland
- Time zone: UTC+1 (CET)
  - Summer (DST): UTC+2 (CEST)

Nikkaluokta (Swedish pronunciation: [ˈnɪ̌kːalʉɔkta]; North Sámi: Nihkkáluokta; Meänkieli: Nikkulahti) is a Swedish Sami village in Norrbotten County. The village belongs to Gällivare Municipality, bordering Kiruna Municipality, the closest urban area some 60 kilometers away. In its vicinity lie the areas of two Sami communities, Laevas and Girjas, that still herd semi-domesticated reindeer in the region.

Nikkaluokta has a mountain lodge, complete with a small grocery store and restaurant, a chapel, and, during the summer months, a commercial helicopter base. It is a popular starting point for several hiking and skiing trails in the Kebnekaise area, including the notable Kungsleden. It takes around five hours to travel the 19 kilometer distance between the two mountain lodges in Nikkaluokta and Kebnekaise.

Nikkaluokta is sited in the centre of three valleys, where the tarmac road from Kiruna Municipality ends. To travel further, trails and mountain paths of varying size and condition must be used. Nikkaluokta Bay in Lake Ladtjojaure is also the starting point for the water route into scenic Vistas Valley.

== Image gallery ==
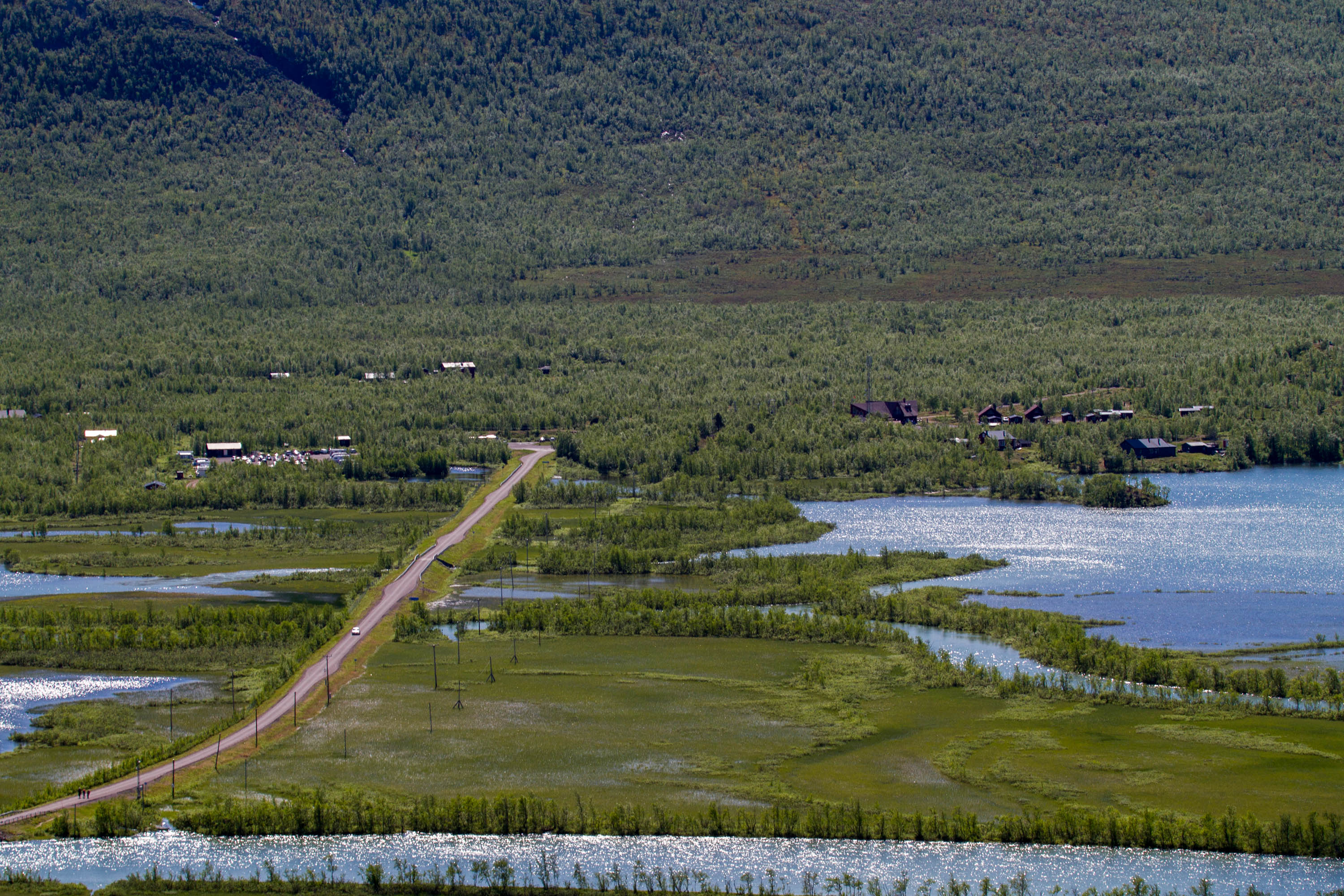
Aerial view of Nikkaluokta from nearby height

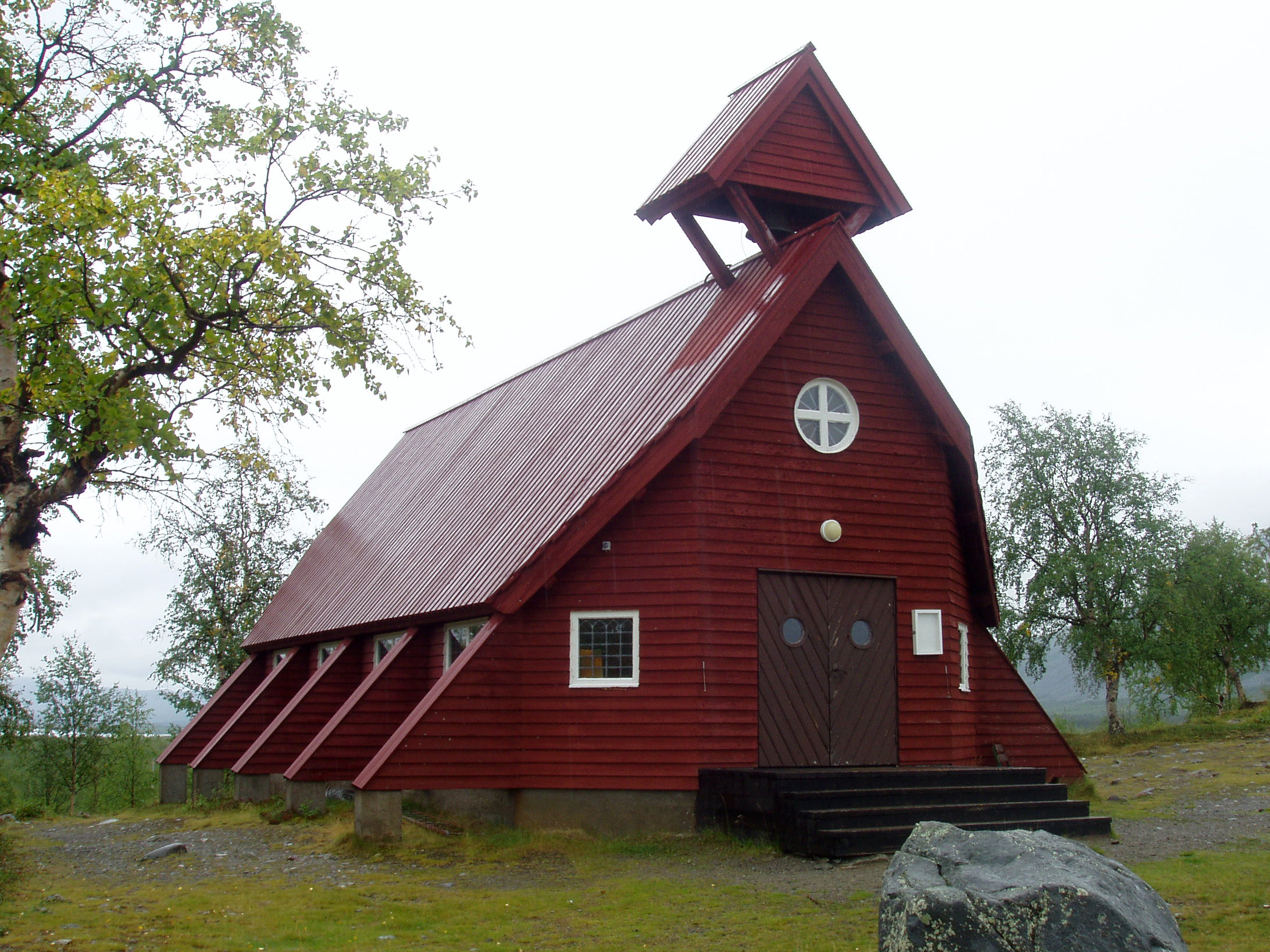
The chapel

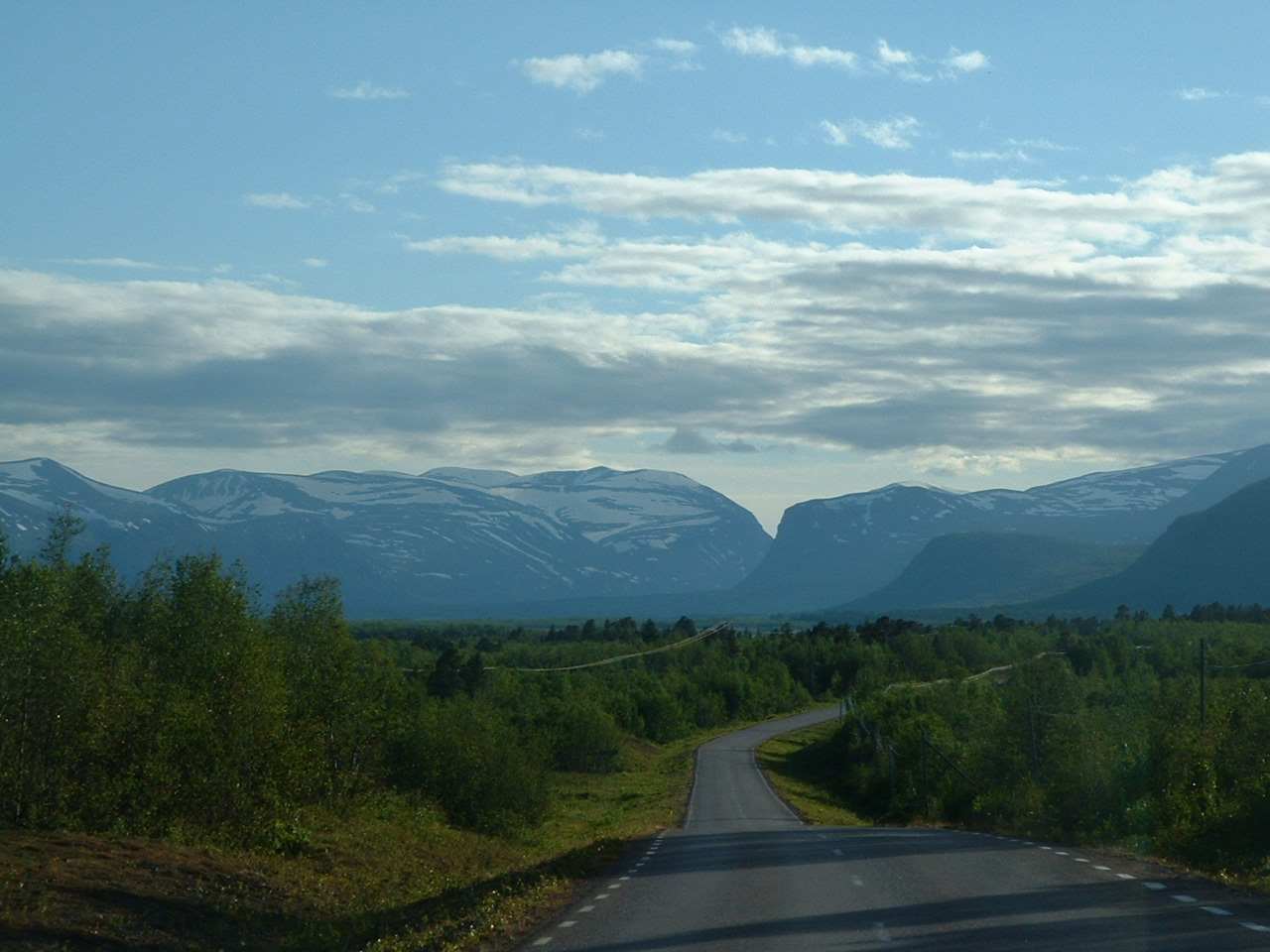
The tarmac road leading into Nikkaluokta

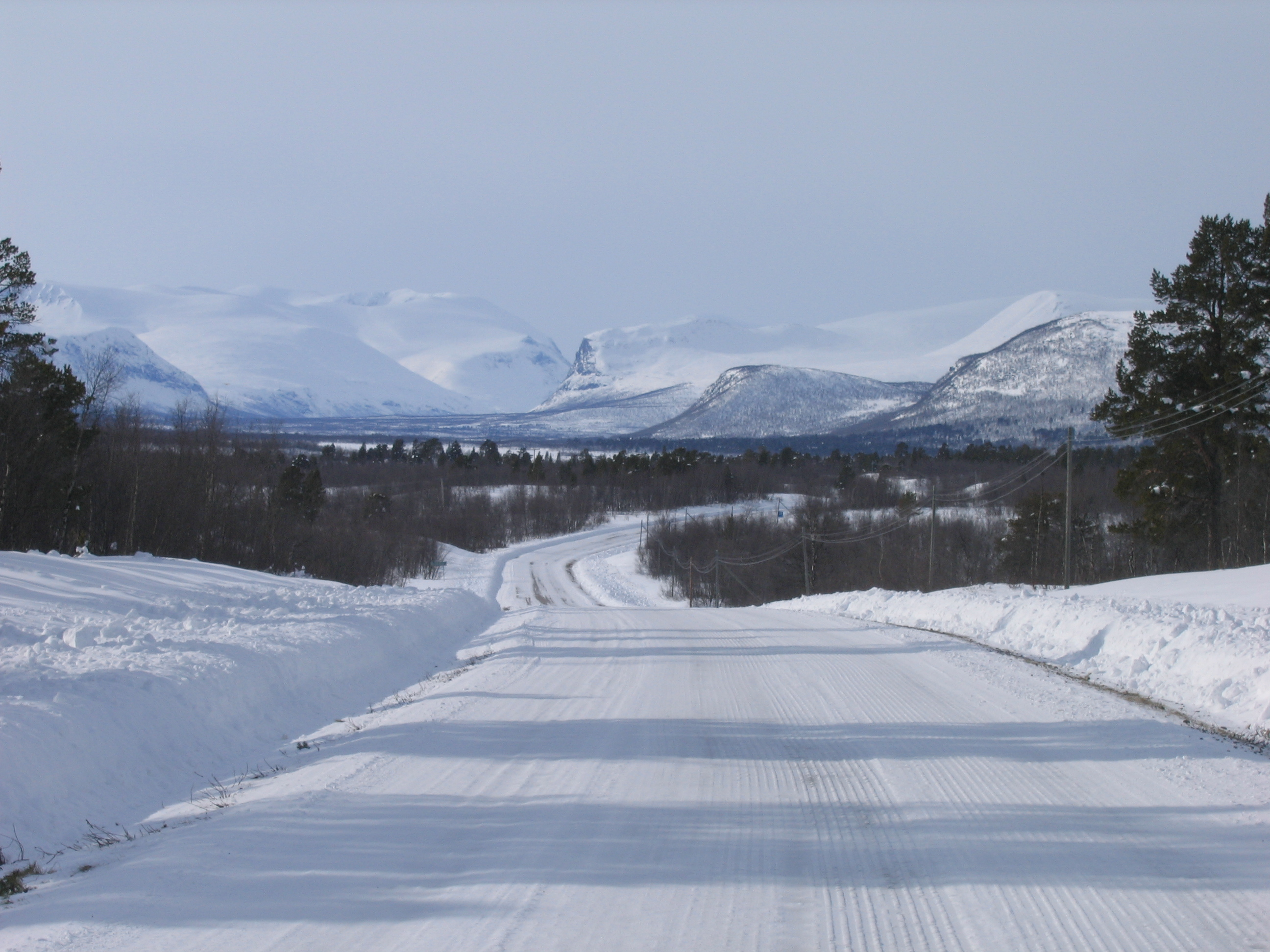
The same road in winter

== Climate ==
Nikkaluokta has a subarctic, boreal, climate (Dfc) since only two months of the short summer have temperature averages that exceed 10 degrees Celsius followed by long and very cold winters where seven months have mean averages below freezing. However, considering its far northerly latitude, winters are comparatively less extreme than on similar latitudes elsewhere in the world, but temperatures below −40 °C (−40 °F) are not infrequent, even by late spring in May lows are still averaging below freezing, with frosts during the midnight sun phase not uncommon.

Climate data for Nikkaluokta (averages 2002–2015; precipitation 1961–1990, extremes since 1951)
Month	Jan	Feb	Mar	Apr	May	Jun	Jul	Aug	Sep	Oct	Nov	Dec	Year
Record high °C (°F)	8.6 (47.5)	9.4 (48.9)	10.0 (50.0)	14.6 (58.3)	24.8 (76.6)	28.5 (83.3)	28.5 (83.3)	28.5 (83.3)	24.0 (75.2)	16.3 (61.3)	12.0 (53.6)	11.0 (51.8)	28.5 (83.3)
Mean daily maximum °C (°F)	−11.6 (11.1)	−9.2 (15.4)	−4.6 (23.7)	1.1 (34.0)	7.7 (45.9)	14.1 (57.4)	16.8 (62.2)	14.4 (57.9)	9.0 (48.2)	2.4 (36.3)	−5.4 (22.3)	−10.3 (13.5)	2.0 (35.7)
Daily mean °C (°F)	−17.8 (0.0)	−15.9 (3.4)	−11.0 (12.2)	−4.2 (24.4)	3.1 (37.6)	9.2 (48.6)	11.5 (52.7)	9.6 (49.3)	4.5 (40.1)	−1.7 (28.9)	−10.5 (13.1)	−15.3 (4.5)	−3.2 (26.2)
Mean daily minimum °C (°F)	−25.0 (−13.0)	−22.6 (−8.7)	−17.5 (0.5)	−9.6 (14.7)	−1.7 (28.9)	4.3 (39.7)	6.3 (43.3)	4.9 (40.8)	0.0 (32.0)	−5.8 (21.6)	−15.9 (3.4)	−22.3 (−8.1)	−8.7 (16.3)
Record low °C (°F)	−46.2 (−51.2)	−49.4 (−56.9)	−42.0 (−43.6)	−34.0 (−29.2)	−22.2 (−8.0)	−5.2 (22.6)	−2.5 (27.5)	−8.5 (16.7)	−13.1 (8.4)	−30.0 (−22.0)	−39.0 (−38.2)	−45.0 (−49.0)	−49.4 (−56.9)
Average precipitation mm (inches)	30.6 (1.20)	23.5 (0.93)	25.5 (1.00)	27.4 (1.08)	29.2 (1.15)	41.2 (1.62)	76.7 (3.02)	65.2 (2.57)	45.7 (1.80)	43.3 (1.70)	39.7 (1.56)	32.1 (1.26)	480.1 (18.89)
Source 1:
Source 2:
