= Kebnekaise =

Sweden's highest mountain

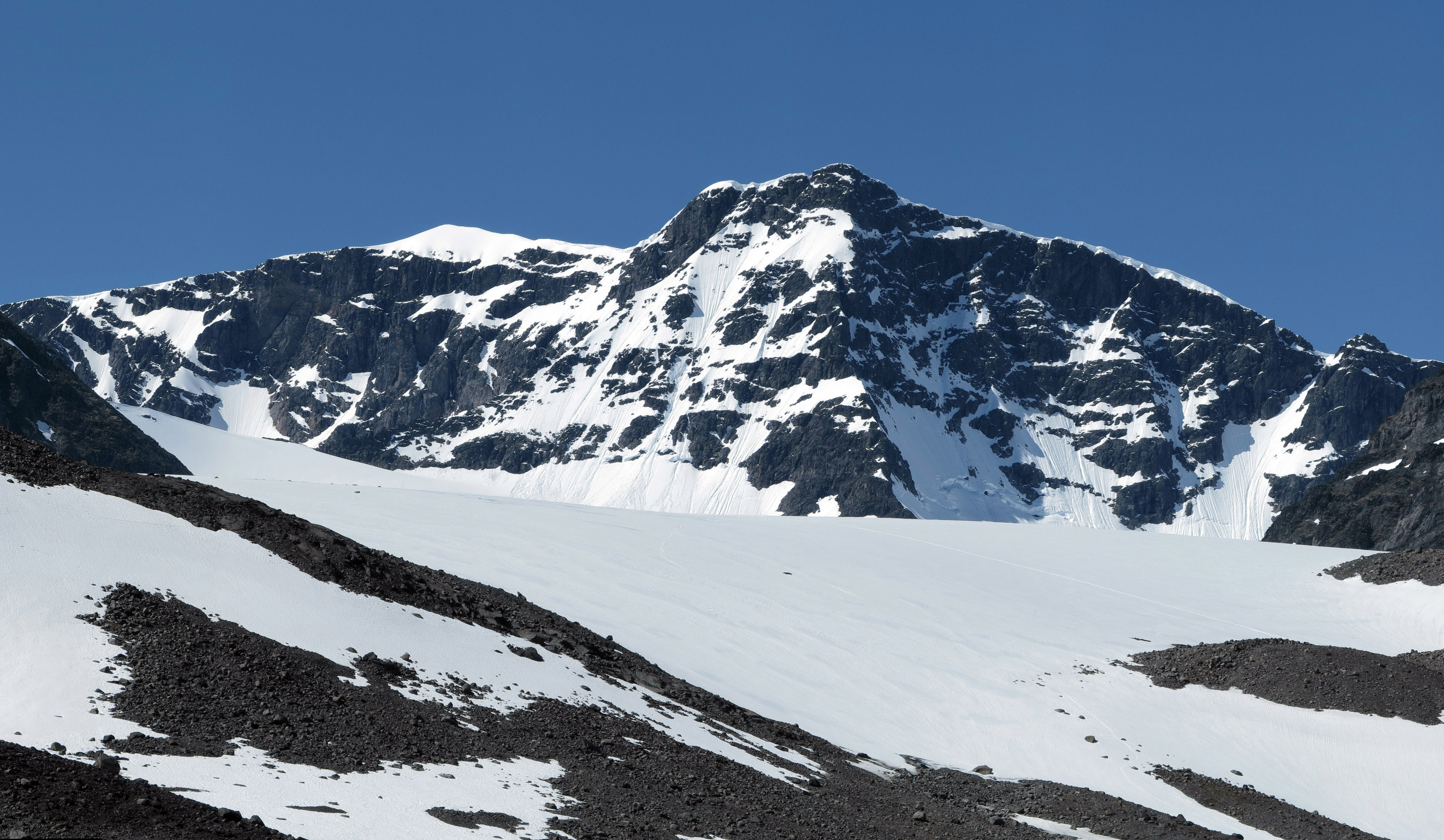
- Eastern slopes of Kebnekaise as seen from the Tarfala Valley

Highest point
- Elevation: 2,096.8 m (6,879 ft)
- Prominence: 1,738 m (5,702 ft)
- Listing: Country high point Ultra
- Coordinates: 67°54′16″N 18°31′42″E

Geography
- Location within Sweden
- Location: Sweden
- Parent range: Scandinavian Mountains

Climbing
- First ascent: 22 August 1883 by Charles Rabot
- Easiest route: rock/ice walk; most popular route includes simple scrambling

Kebnekaise (Swedish pronunciation: [kɛbnɛˈkâjsɛ]; from Sami Giebmegáisi or Giebnegáisi, "Cauldron Crest") is the highest mountain in Sweden. The Kebnekaise massif, which is part of the Scandinavian mountain range, has two main peaks. The glaciated southern peak used to be the highest at 2,120 metres (6,960 ft) above sea level, but has shrunk by 24 meters during the last 50 years, making the northern icefree peak at 2,096.8 metres (6,879 ft) the highest. Kebnekaise lies in Swedish Lapland, about 150 kilometres (93 mi) north of the Arctic Circle and west of Kiruna near the Kungsleden hiking trail between Abisko and Hemavan.

== Geography ==
The Kebnekaise massif lies within a range of the Scandinavian mountains that is bordered by the glacial valleys Ladtjovagge (Sami spelling Láddjuvággi), Tjäktjavagge (Čeakčavággi) and Vistasvagge (Visttasvággi). The highest points of the massif lie along the ridge (called "Vargryggen" in Swedish) that runs from the southern and northern summits to Kebnepakte (Giebmebákti) at 1,981 metres (6,499 ft). Other subsidiary peaks are Kebnetjåkka (Giebmečohkka), Vierranvárri, Tolpagorni 1,662 metres (5,453 ft) , Guobircohkka 1,506 metres (4,941 ft), and Siŋŋibákti 1,614 metres (5,295 ft).

Of the two highest points, the southern peak lies on a glacier situated on a rocky plateau. The glacier has shrunk in recent years, and therefore the summit is not as high as earlier. The top was traditionally said to be 2,111 metres (6,926 ft), and higher in the oldest measurement, i.e. 2,117 metres (6,946 ft). If the melting continues at the same rate, the south peak will sink below the north peak (which is the highest fixed point in Sweden) within a few years' time. However, as of July 2015, Tarfala Research Station reports that the glacier has grown by 4.5 to 2,102 metres (15 to 6,896 ft) — from its lowest measurement of 2,097.5 metres (6,882 ft) the previous year.

The massif is heavily glaciated, with Kebnepakteglaciären, Isfallsglaciären, and Storglaciären towards Tarfala Valley to the east, Björlings glaciär to the southeast, and Rabots glaciär to the west, plus several smaller glaciers throughout the area.

Permafrost is widely distributed in the Kebnekaise massif. This is supported by a 100 m deep drilling in bedrock in the Tarfala Valley at the foot of the Kebnekaise. The borehole above the Tarfala research station at an altitude of 1540 meters shows a year-round stable rock temperature of −2.75 °C at a depth of 100 m, which, according to the geothermal gradient indicates a permafrost thickness of about 330 meters. In consequence, the much higher Kebnekaise must show a permafrost thickness of several hundred meters.

In Europe there are no higher mountains further north. During clear weather, a vast area can be seen from the summit, according to some sources as much as 9% of Sweden.

== Climbing routes ==
Kebnekaise mountain lodge (Kebnekaise fjällstation) is located to the southeast at the foot of Kebnekaise, about 19 kilometres (12 mi), 3–7 hours hike from the trailhead at Nikkaluokta (boat trip possible for 5 km). It is the starting point for an ascent of the south summit via the western route (västra leden, about 9 kilometres (5.6 mi), 5–7 hours to the summit) or the eastern route (östra leden, about 10 kilometres (6.2 mi), 3–5 hours to the summit). The western route leads over steep scree slopes and the intermediate peak Vierranvárri. Most of this route to the top is simple hiking, but there is a short exposed part that could possibly count as scrambling (YDS grade 2). The eastern route leads over glaciers and rocks and offers exposure (YDS grade 4). The steepest section is equipped with fixed steel cables for protection, similar to a via ferrata. There is also a third, less known route only marked with cairns — "Durlings led", which branches off Kungsleden a few kilometers north of Singi, goes about two kilometers into Singivagge, and then turns north into the valley between Kuopertjåkka and Siŋŋibákti. "Durlings led" eventually merges with the western route at "Kaffedalen", the pass between Vierranvárri and Kebnekaise. Advantages with this route are lack of exposure and a shorter ascent if Singivagge is used for an overnight camp. A fit hiker used to off track rock and scree walking can summit from the Kungsleden in good weather in about 6 hours up and 4–5 hours back down.

Just below the top plateau is an old smaller cabin at 1,880 metres (6,170 ft) altitude. A large cabin used to stand below the plateau, near the smaller one, until September 2018, when it was demolished by the county administration due to being too worn. A cabin up on the plateau was opened in 2016 as a replacement.

The peak glacier is a small top, merely tens of meters high, on a rocky plateau. To approach the actual mountaintop on the glacier, crampons or other means of enhancing traction may be required, depending on snow conditions. The glacier should be walked upon with great caution; fatal accidents have occurred with people sliding off into the huge void on the eastern side. This danger might not always be apparent, even when there is good visibility.

Routes to the northern summit, including one via the narrow, icy arête from the southern summit, require mountaineering equipment and skills.

Due to the harsh subarctic climate at the location, Kebnekaise sees the vast majority of climbers during the summer months (late June to early September). However, Kebnekaise is also an established destination for winter alpinism and guided skiing tours are organised by the STF lodge's guides.

== Climbing history ==
The first recorded ascent to the summit was made on 22 August 1883 by an expedition led by Charles Rabot from France with the locals Jon Larsson, Hans Monsen and Peder Abrahamsson Lindgren. They started from the Skjomen fjord, Norway since the first railway in the region was built 1888. This was only published later. More media attention was given to the first Swedish expedition led by Johan Alfred Björling who summited on 9 July 1889.

The Kebnekaise mountain lodge was opened in 1908, starting more substantial tourism to the mountain.

The fastest ascent from the mountain lodge to the summit and back is 1:47:17 made on 9 July 2020 by Petter Engdahl. The fastest woman is Emelie Forsberg in 2:00:40 done on 7 July 2014.

== Norwegian military plane crash ==
On 15 March 2012 a RNoAF Lockheed Martin C-130J Super Hercules military aircraft crashed into the western snowy mountain side a short distance below the ridge that runs between the mountain's two highest peaks. Five Norwegian officers were killed.

== Panorama ==
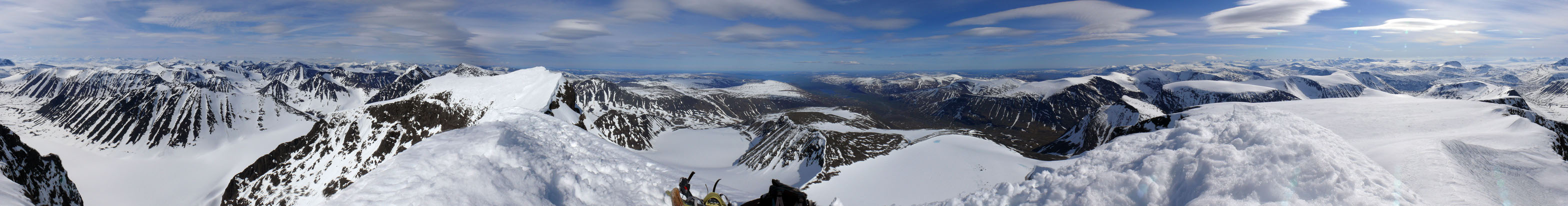
Panoramic view from the top, June 2007, the view shown is roughly from west (left) over north to south (right)

== See also ==
- Storglaciären
- Tarfala research station
- Tarfala Valley

== Gallery ==
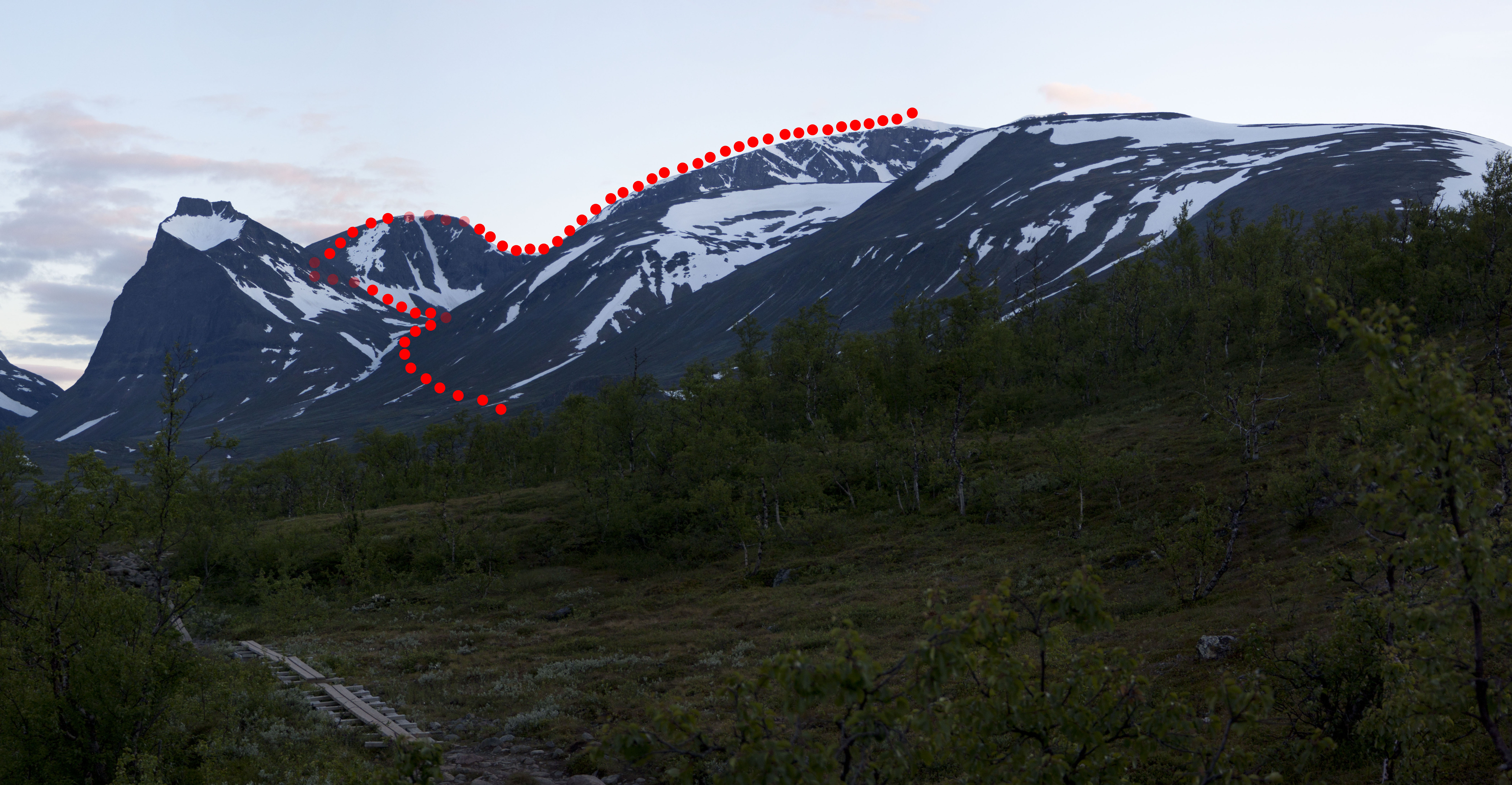
The western route marked with red dots.

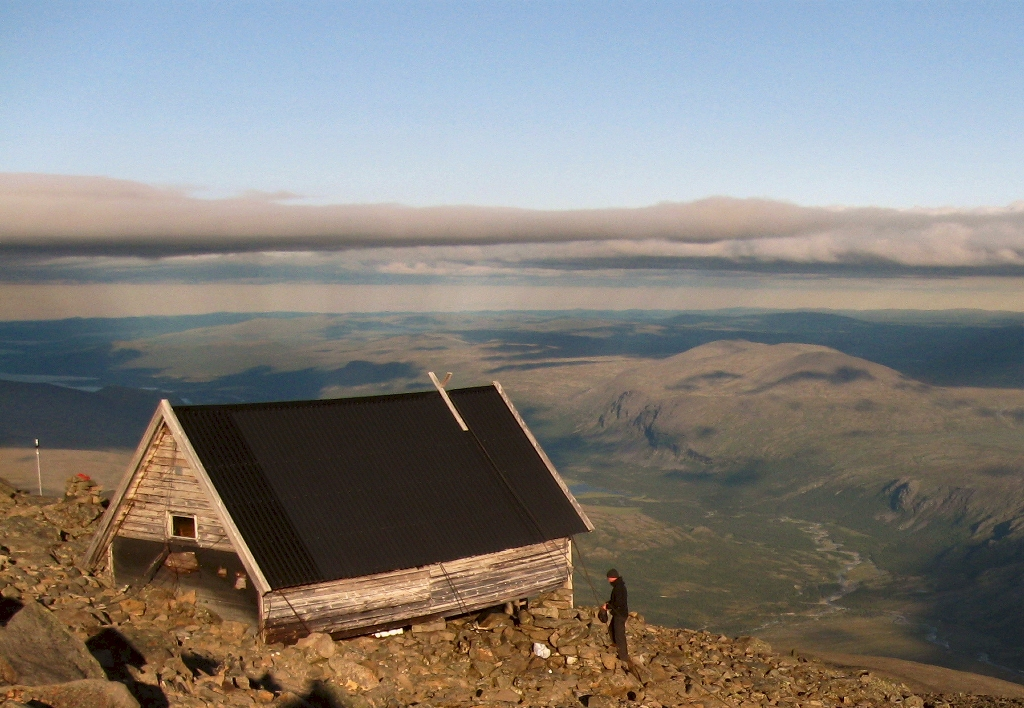
The oldest of the cabins close to the peak; standing at an 1880-meter altitude, built in 1924.

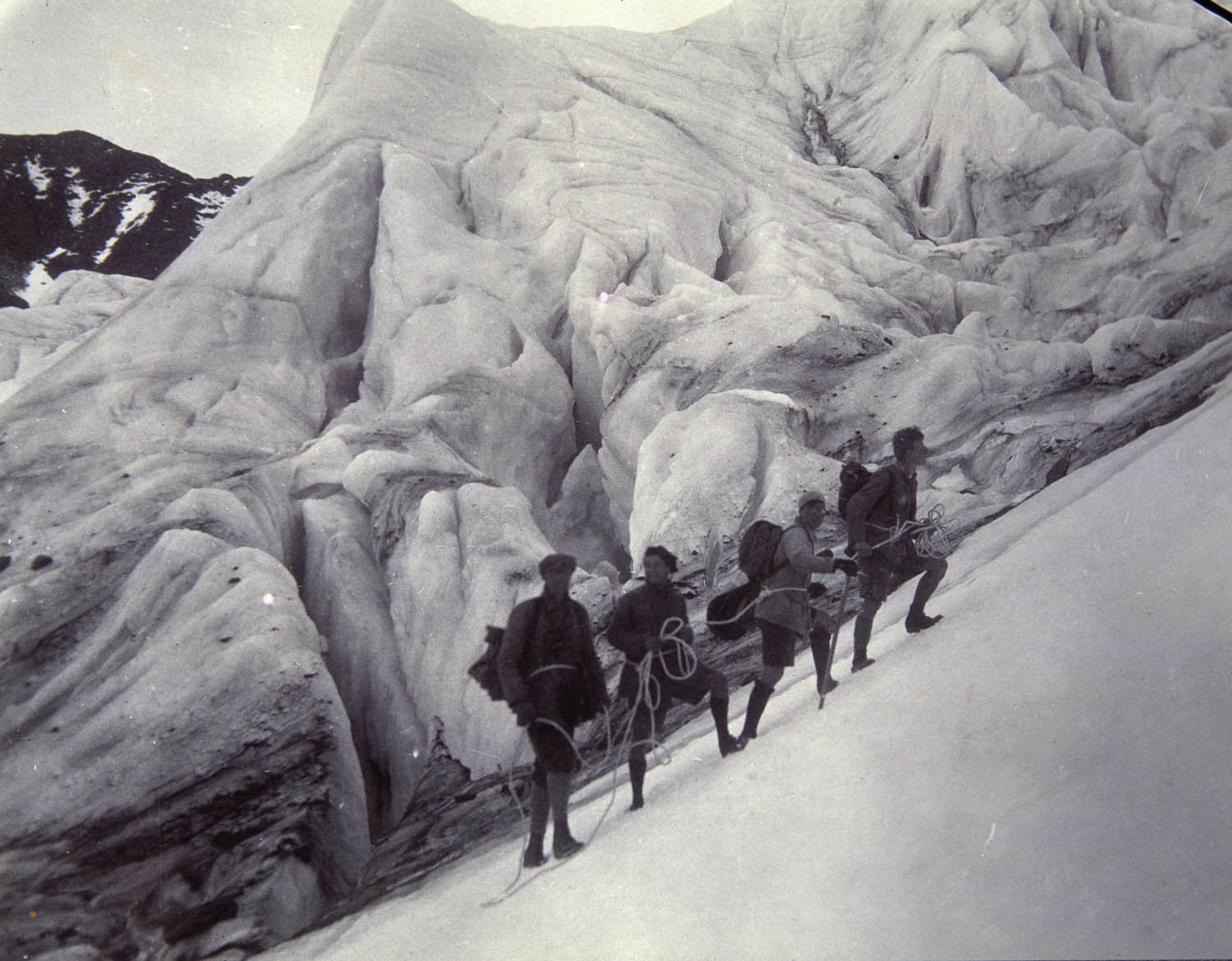
Mountaineers on Kebnekaise, early 20th century.

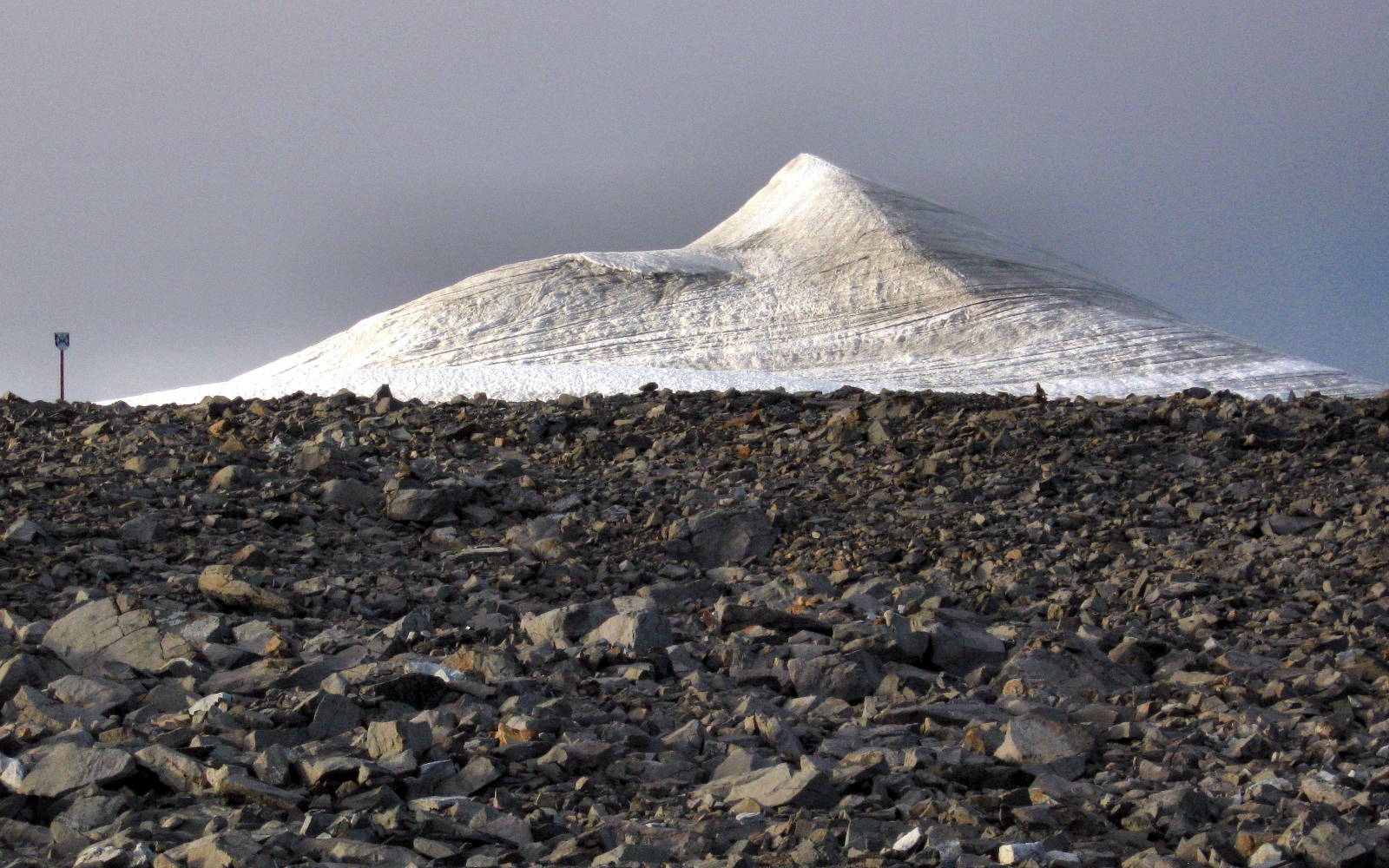
The peak glacier seen from the trail, rising from a nearly flat plateau.
