= West Air Luxembourg =

Airline

IATA	ICAO	Call sign
NI	WLX	WEST LUX
- Founded: 2002
- Ceased operations: 2014
- Parent company: FAST Logistics Luxembourg
- Headquarters: Bertrange, Luxembourg
- Key people: Koster Peter (Manager)
- Website: http://www.westair.lu/

West Air Luxembourg was a subsidiary of FAST Logistics Luxembourg, founded in 2002 by West Air Europe. It primarily operated as an air feeder for express mail companies like TNT, DHL, FedEx, and UPS. Before its sale and dissolution in 2014, the company managed a fleet comprising 15 BAe ATPs and one ATR-72.

== History ==
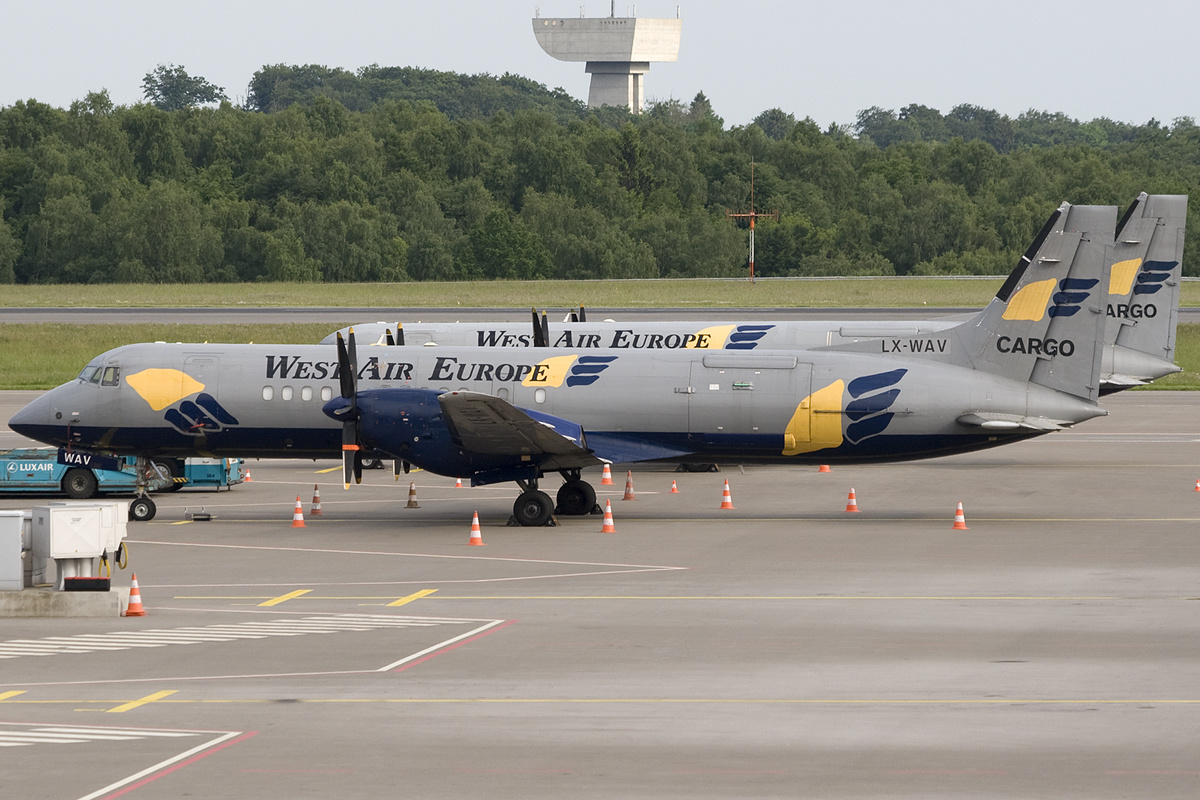
British Aerospace ATP aircraft in 2009

West Air Luxembourg was founded in 2002 by West Air Europe, serving as a sister company to West Air Sweden. West Air Luxembourg was founded to mitigate the rising labour costs of its Swedish operations and position itself closer to the operational and decision centres of its primary customers. Subsequently, much of the West Air Sweden fleet was transferred to the West Air Luxembourg AOC. Throughout its existence, the principal focus remained on providing feeder services to major overnight express carriers.

In 2011, parent company West Air Europe merged with Atlantic Airlines to form West Atlantic.

In October 2013, West Atlantic announced the sale of its West Air Luxembourg subsidiary to FAST Logistics Luxembourg. Before the sale, West Atlantic moved all but one aircraft in the West Air Luxembourg fleet to the AOC of West Air Sweden.

In 2014, West Air Luxembourg was rebranded as Smart Cargo following its sale to FAST Logistics.
