= Swn =

Swn or SWN can mean:

- Something with Numbers, Australian Band
- Sŵn, a festival
- Single-Walled Nanotubes
- ICAO designator of the Swedish cargo airline West Air Sweden (or West Atlantic).
- Socialist Workers Network, Irish Trotskyist organisation
- Science Without Numbers, 1980 book on the philosophy of mathematics
- SoHo Weekly News, defunct New York City alternative weekly newspaper
