= Canarias Regional Air =

Spanish charter airline

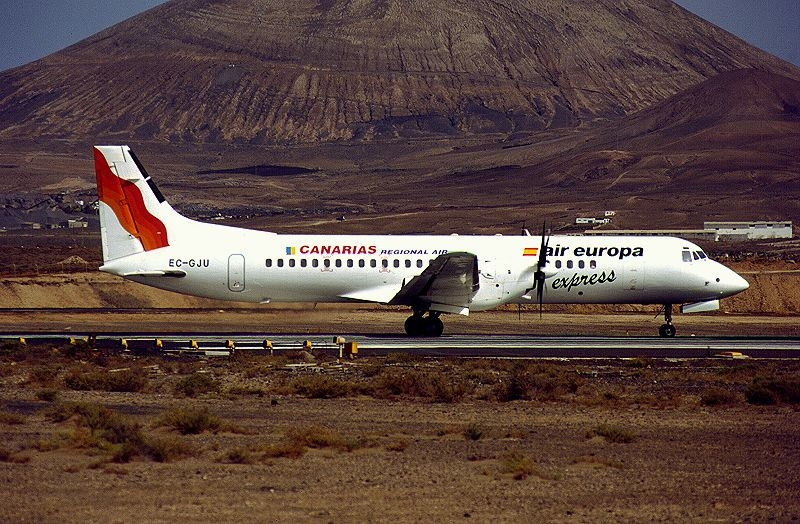
- Canarias Regional Air British Aerospace ATP at Lanzarote Airport
IATA	ICAO	Call sign
FW	CNM	-
- Commenced operations: 1998
- Ceased operations: 2000
- Operating bases: Tenerife North Airport
- Fleet size: Fleet below
- Headquarters: Puerto de la Cruz, Spain

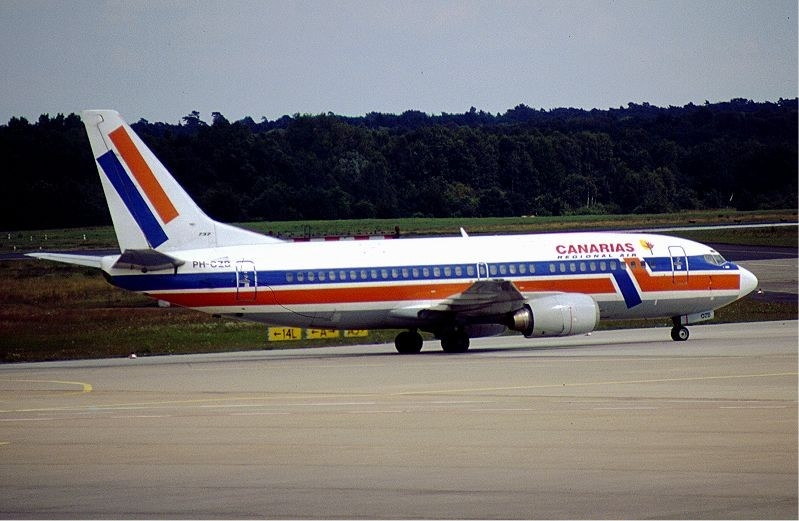
The Boeing 737 used during the brief attempt by Canarias Regional Air to operate independently.

Canarias Regional Air was a Spanish charter airline based in Santa Cruz de Tenerife, Canary Islands.

== Company history ==
Canarias Regional Air was founded in 1998 in an effort to compete with Binter —a subsidiary of Iberia. It began operations from Tenerife North Airport. Canarias Regional Air had an association with Air Europa Express —a now defunct subsidiary of Air Europa— for the operation of a number of British Aerospace ATP turboprop aircraft in short-haul flights between the islands.

The company tried to operate as an independent airline after the agreement with Air Europa Express expired but the venture was not successful. Canarias Regional Air ceased operations in 2000, shortly after an attempt at operating charter flights with a newly acquired Boeing 737.

== Fleet ==
- 10 BAe ATP
- 1 Boeing 737-300

== See also ==
- List of defunct airlines of Spain
