= Stora Sjöfallet National Park =

Protected area in Norrbotten County, northern Sweden

- Stora Sjöfallets nationalpark; Stuor Muorkke suoddjimpárkka
- IUCN category II (national park)
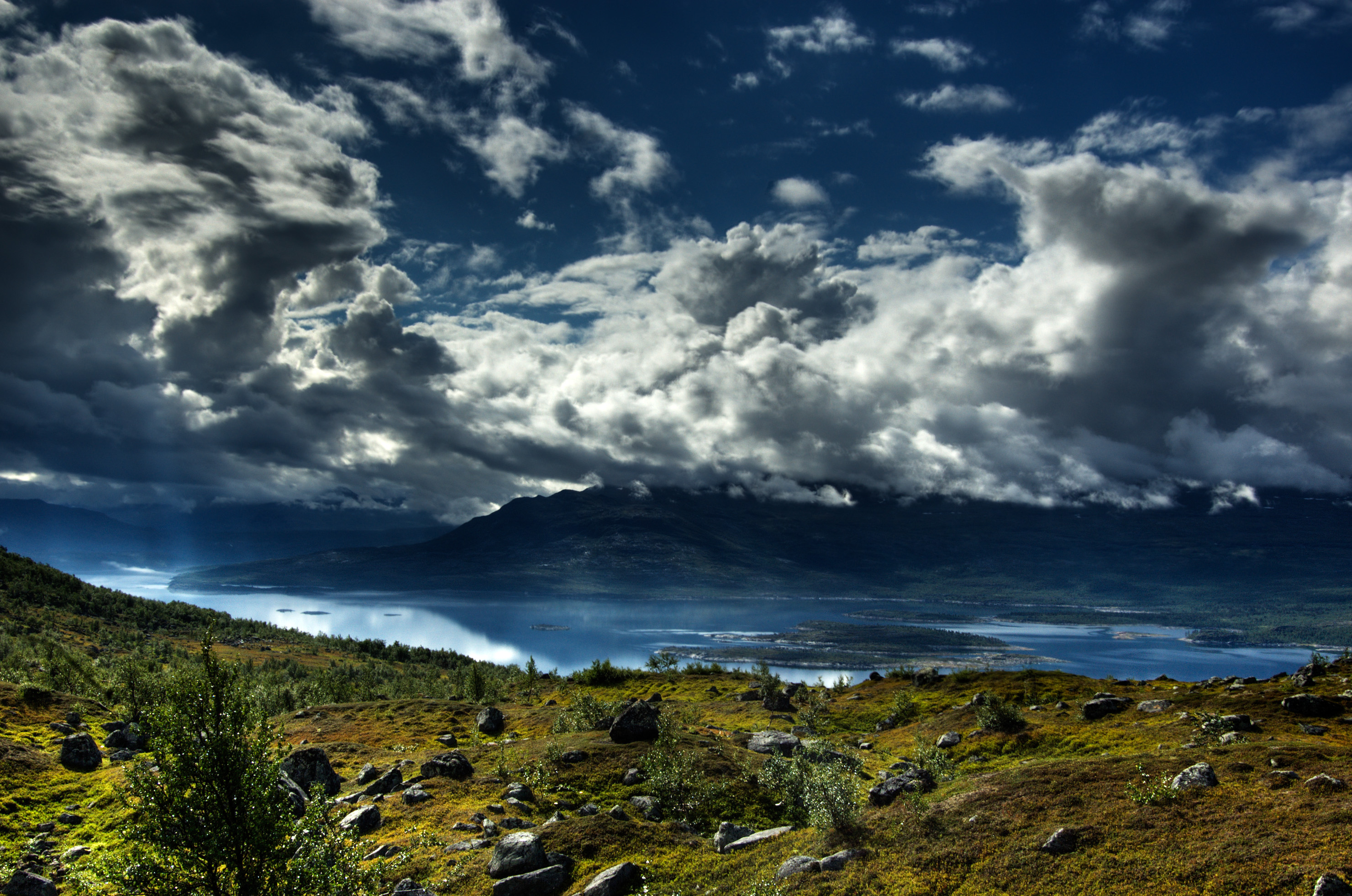
- Suorvajaure from Vakkotavare
- Interactive map of Stora Sjöfallet National Park
- Location: Norrbotten County, Sweden
- Coordinates: 67°29′N 18°21′E
- Area: 1,278 km^{2} (493 sq mi)
- Established: 1909
- Governing body: Naturvårdsverket

National parks of Sweden (clickable map)

Stora Sjöfallet (Swedish: [ˈstǔːra ˈɧø̂ːfalːɛt], lit. 'The Great Lake Falls'; Lule Sami: Stuor Muorkke, lit. 'Great Portage') is a national park in Norrbotten County in northern Sweden, in Gällivare Municipality and Jokkmokk Municipality. The national park covers 1,278 km^{2} (493 mi^{2}) and is the third-largest in Sweden. The park is located about 20 km (12 mi) north of the Arctic Circle by the Norwegian border and surrounds the Akkajaure reservoir from the north, east and south.

The area was declared a national park in 1909. The national park is part of the Laponian area, which is a UNESCO World Heritage Site. Stora Sjöfallet is also a part of Natura 2000, which is a network for protected areas in the European Union.

== History ==
When the national park was created in 1909 the main reason was the great waterfall called Stuor Muorkkegårttje in the Sami languages. The great waterfalls at the heart of the park were historically among the most powerful and visually striking in Europe, but relatively soon after the area was given its protected status, the government permitted hydroelectric development of the falls, which deprived the sheer drop of most of its visible water flow except for a few times a year and damaged the shorelines of Akkajaure.

Later developments in this part of the park include a power line, roads, and gravel banks. Already in the 1960s the status as national park was questioned due to these severe changes, and today the area of the falls is no longer a part of the national park. Today the lake Akkajaure, that divides the park into two, is artificial.

The name of the park comes from a five-level waterfall on the Lule River. Each of the five levels is named after a man who has been important in the history of Lapland. The first is SG Hermelin (Hermelin's fall), who was a great entrepreneur in the industrial history of Norrbotten. Lars Levi Laestadius, the founder of Laestadianism, and Düben, doctor and author of the book Om lappland och lapparne (transl. About Lapland and the Lapps), have also given their names to levels in the fall. The two last levels were named after Carl Anton Petterson, who presented the Stora sjöfallet to the Swedish people, and Henrik Adolf Widmark, who was strongly committed to the mountains of Lapland.

The mountains were formed about 400 million years ago when two continents collided. The sea between them disappeared and the sediment of the seabed was pressed into a mountain range. There are still traces from the ice age in the area, for example terminal moraines and outcrops polished by the ice.

== Geography ==
The part of the park south of the lake Akkajaure, which has been broken out of the park, is dominated by the mountain Áhkká, which is also called "the queen of Lapland" or "Nils Holgersson's mountain" after Selma Lagerlöf's story. The lower hills in the south of the park are covered by forests of fir trees. North of the lake is the mountain Kallaktjåkkå, whose north face faces the narrow and deep Teusa-valley.

The park's highest peak is 2,015 m (6,611 ft) above sea level and is a part of the mountain massif Áhkká, which has thirteen peaks and ten glaciers.

Global warming makes the glaciers melt 10 m (33 ft) each year.

== Plants and animals ==
The flora is one of the reasons that the area became a national park. The bedrock is lime-poor, which has resulted in large areas covered with dwarf birch and crowberry. The park also has plenty of lichens and sjöfallskvartsiten or "the Sjöfalls' sandstone" is unique for the park.

Of the approximately 400 species of flora that can be found in the mountains, about half of them have been found in Stora sjöfallet national park. Arenaria humifusa is an example. Cloudberry, which is also called "the gold of Lapland", can be found in the park from the middle of July to the end of August.

About 125 different species of birds have been observed in the park. Some common species are European golden plover, meadow pipit, and northern wheatear. Eurasian whimbrel, long-tailed jaeger, eagle, and rough-legged buzzard can also be seen and, with a bit of luck, the unusual species lesser white-fronted goose, gyrfalcon, and great grey owl can be observed. Sjaunja, the largest bird reserve in Sweden, borders to the park in the east.

Mammals that one can catch sight of are reindeer, moose, red fox, ermine, and rabbit. Among these, the reindeer is the most common, and two Sami communities', Sörkaitum and Sirka, pastures are within the area. Rarer species that can also be observed are lynx, wolverine, Arctic fox, and brown bear.

The large differences in altitude have resulted in large differences in the vegetation, for example old-growth forest, mountain birch forest, bare mountain, and boulder fields. In the hollows for example globe-flower and aconitum can be found, while the Ranunculus glacialis, snow bunting, and rock ptarmigan prefer higher altitudes.

== Tourism ==
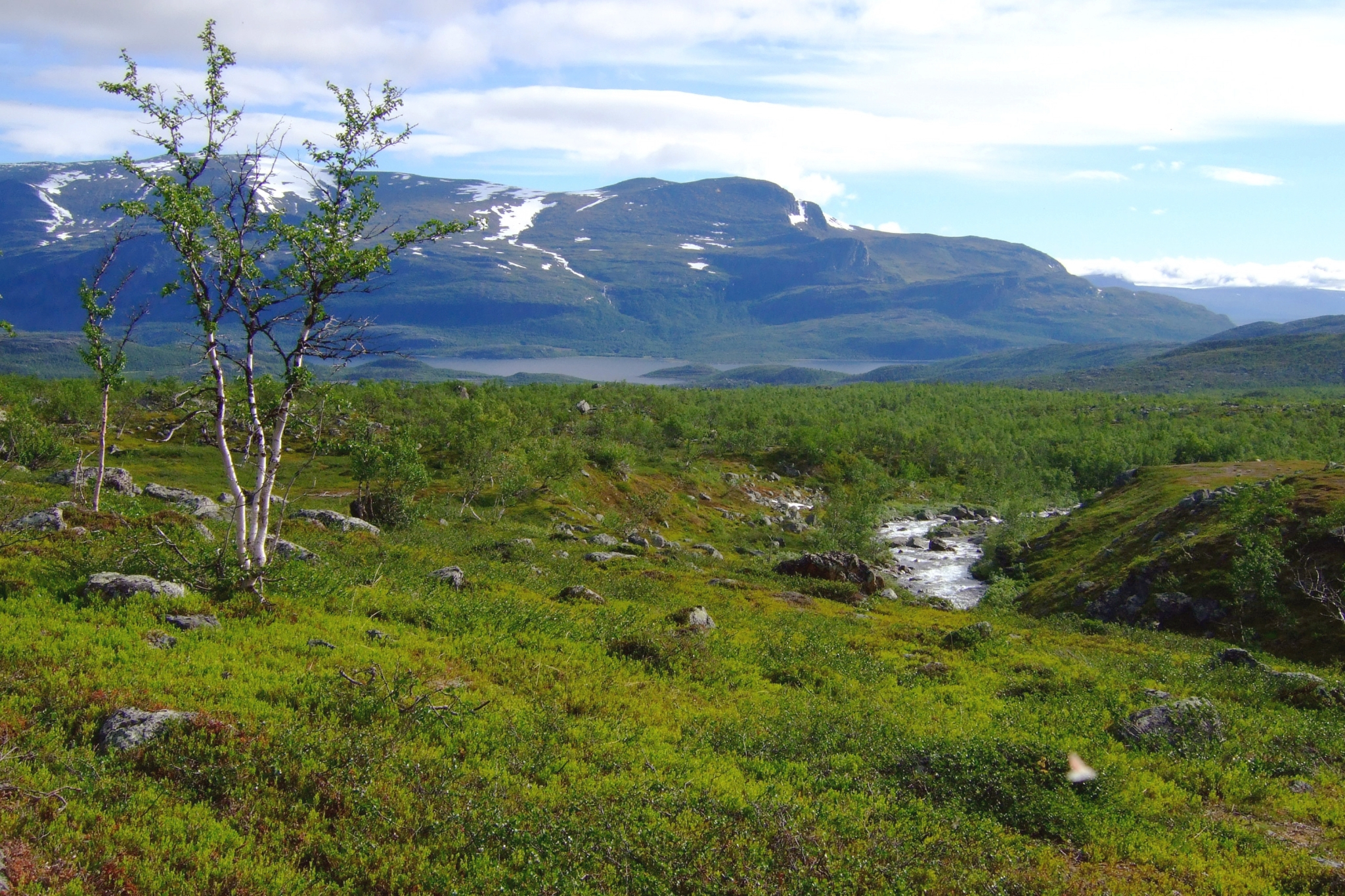
The lake Kårtejaure and the stream Njabbejåkkå seen from the tree line above Suorva

The national park is easiest to reach from the road from Porjus. The road passes Vietas and continues to the west end of the park. It is most appropriate to visit the park between March and September, but other periods work as well.

Kungsleden passes through the northern part of the national park. In the south part of the park there are no trails or cabins.

Some attractions are the Count and the Countess, the Áhkká massif, the Áhkká terraces, Seven sisters, and the Teusa valley.

Cabins can be found in some parts of the park. Otherwise accommodation can be found in Vietas and at Stora Sjöfallet's mountain resort. Activities that are offered are fishing, skiing, snowmobiling, hiking, and ice climbing.

There are special rules for people that visit the park. For example, it is forbidden to:

- hunt, fish, or catch insects.
- pick or dig up plants.
- break branches or hurt living or dead trees and bushes.
- collect minerals.
- drive a motor vehicle outside special roads.
- ride a horse or bring a dog (during some periods it is allowed to bring the dog if it is on a leash).
- fly in valleys or lower than 300 m (980 ft) above the ground.

However, gathering dead branches to make a fire or arrange protection is permitted. One may also pick berries and fungi.
