= Eurodirect =

Euro Direct Airlines

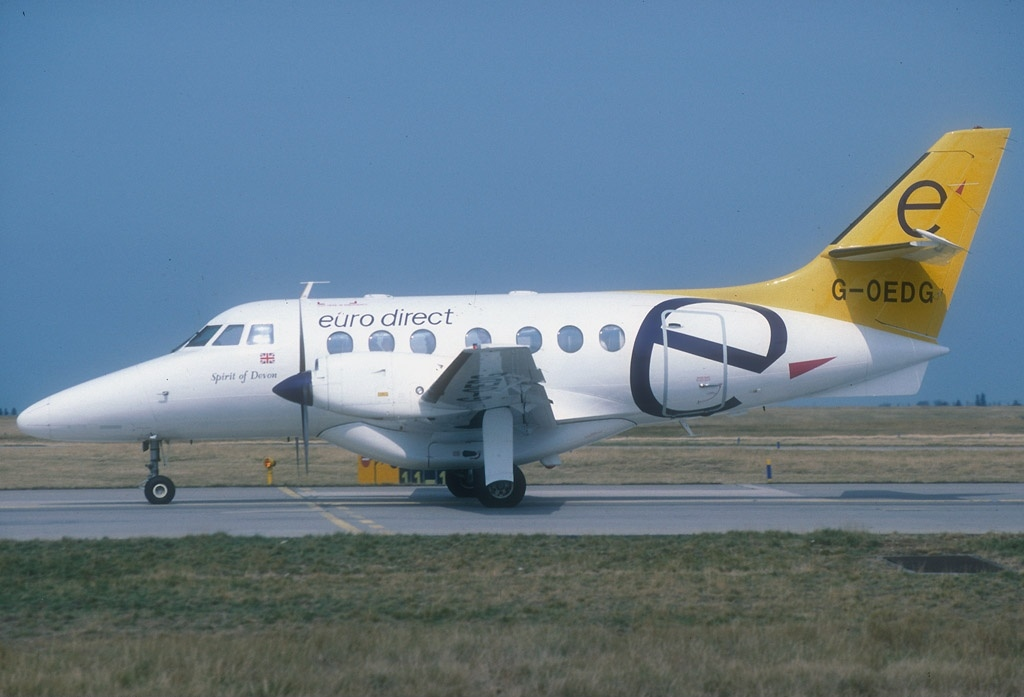
- Jetstream 31
IATA	ICAO	Call sign
9R	—	—
- Founded: January 1994
- Commenced operations: April 1994
- Ceased operations: 26 February 1995
- Operating bases: Bournemouth Airport, England, United Kingdom
- Fleet size: See Historical fleet details below
- Destinations: Gatwick Airport, Glasgow Prestwick Airport, Amsterdam Airport Schiphol

Euro Direct Airlines was a short lived British airline founded in 1994. It was based at Bournemouth Airport in England and flew short haul flights to British and European destinations. Euro Direct flew five British Aerospace ATP aircraft under the IATA designation 9R. The airline maintained several short haul flights from Bournemouth Airport to destinations in Britain, including London Gatwick, Glasgow and Amsterdam, and Continental Europe. After recurring financial problems, the airline ceased all flights on 26 February 1995, after less than a year of operations.

== Fleet ==
- 4 x BAe ATP
- 6 x Jetstream 31

== See also ==
- British Aerospace ATP
- Bournemouth Airport
- List of defunct airlines of the United Kingdom
