= Suorva =

Coordinates: 67°31′34.60″N 18°12′27.40″E

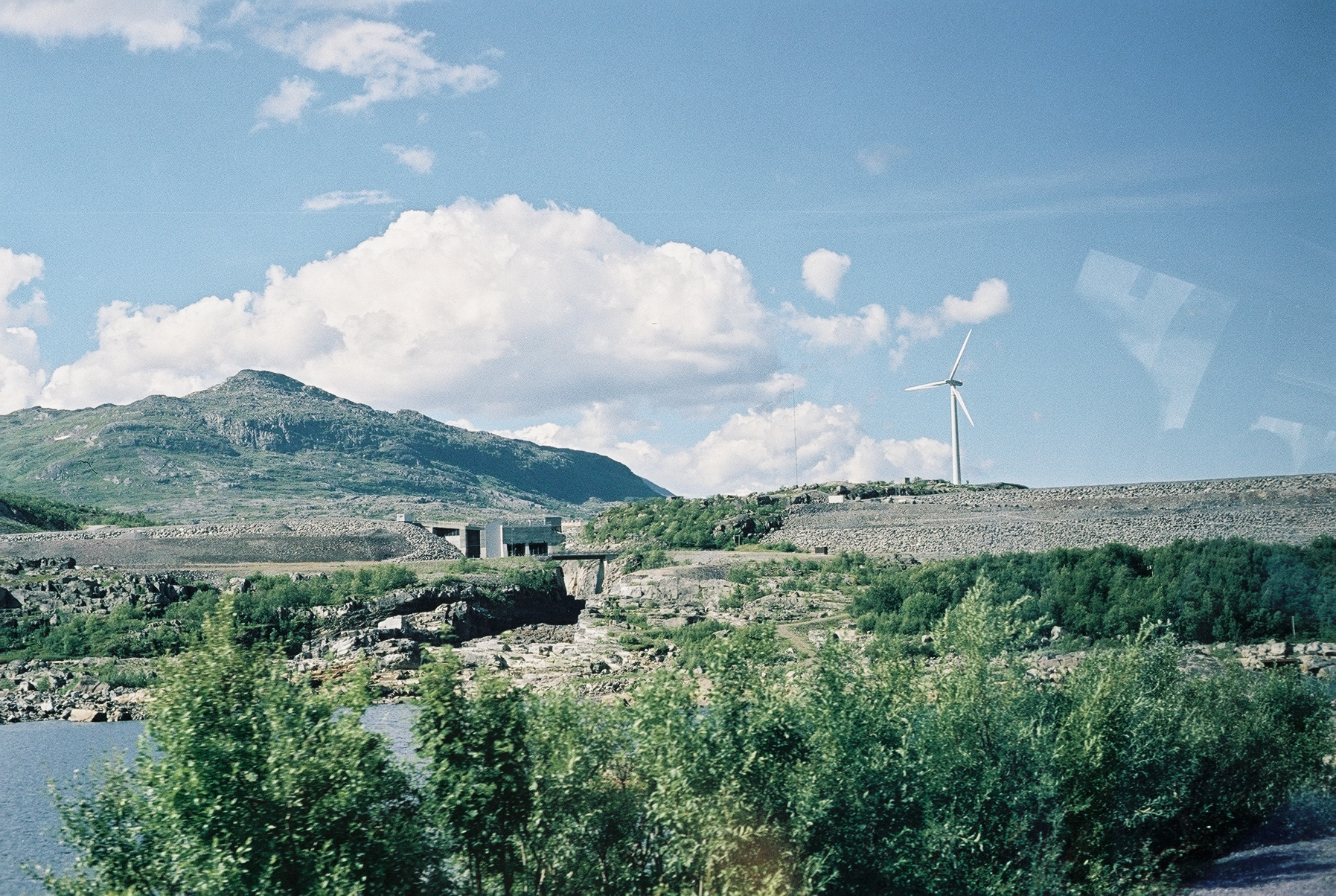
The hydroelectric dam and wind turbine at Suorva.

Suorva (Swedish pronunciation: [sʉˈɔ̌rːva]) or Suorvadammen ("the Suorva Dam") is a small settlement situated at the southern parts of Akkajaure, in Stora Sjöfallet National Park, Sweden. The settlement can be reached by car (and bus, from Gällivare). It consists of a few houses and a dam operated by Vattenfall, which regulates the flow to the hydroelectric plant in Vietas located about 5 kilometers downstream, with its underground powerhouse blasted into the mountainside along the river's left bank. The intake to the powerhouse is located at the dam's northern endpoint. The road over the dam is normally open for hikers (not cars) and makes for a possible route into the northern parts of Sarek National Park which does not require using a boat.

== Climate ==
Climate data for Stora Sjöfallet A 1991-2020 (427m)
| Month | Jan | Feb | Mar | Apr | May | Jun | Jul | Aug | Sep | Oct | Nov | Dec | Year |
|---|---|---|---|---|---|---|---|---|---|---|---|---|---|
| Mean daily maximum °C (°F) | −6.0 (21.2) | −6.2 (20.8) | −3.3 (26.1) | 1.5 (34.7) | 7.1 (44.8) | 12.9 (55.2) | 16.6 (61.9) | 14.9 (58.8) | 9.9 (49.8) | 3.5 (38.3) | −1.1 (30.0) | −3.8 (25.2) | 3.8 (38.9) |
| Daily mean °C (°F) | −10.0 (14.0) | −10.2 (13.6) | −7.0 (19.4) | −1.9 (28.6) | 3.5 (38.3) | 8.9 (48.0) | 12.6 (54.7) | 11.4 (52.5) | 6.9 (44.4) | 1.2 (34.2) | −3.9 (25.0) | −7.3 (18.9) | 0.4 (32.6) |
| Mean daily minimum °C (°F) | −13.9 (7.0) | −14.0 (6.8) | −10.6 (12.9) | −5.4 (22.3) | 0.3 (32.5) | 5.4 (41.7) | 9.4 (48.9) | 8.5 (47.3) | 4.5 (40.1) | −0.8 (30.6) | −6.4 (20.5) | −10.6 (12.9) | −2.8 (27.0) |
Source: NOAA

Climate data for Satis (Vietas) (1991-2020 normals (425m)
| Month | Jan | Feb | Mar | Apr | May | Jun | Jul | Aug | Sep | Oct | Nov | Dec | Year |
|---|---|---|---|---|---|---|---|---|---|---|---|---|---|
| Daily mean °C (°F) | −9.9 (14.2) | −10.4 (13.3) | −6.7 (19.9) | −1.4 (29.5) | 4.2 (39.6) | 9.4 (48.9) | 12.8 (55.0) | 11.3 (52.3) | 6.8 (44.2) | 1.0 (33.8) | −4.4 (24.1) | −7.7 (18.1) | 0.4 (32.7) |
Source: NOAA
