= West Atlantic UK =

British airline

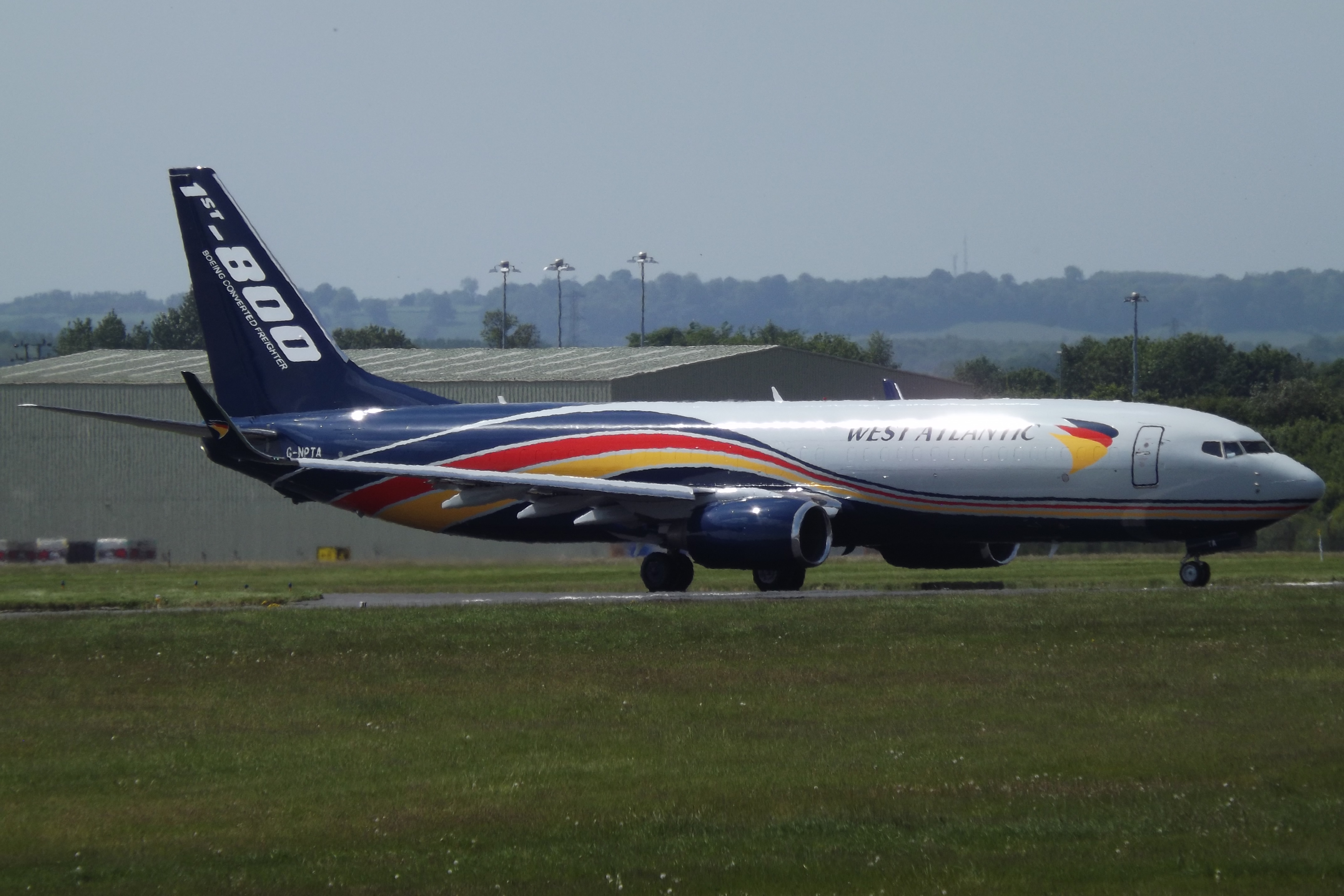
IATA	ICAO	Call sign
—	NPT	NEPTUNE
- Founded: 2001
- Operating bases: East Midlands Airport Edinburgh Airport
- Fleet size: 10
- Parent company: West Atlantic
- Headquarters: East Midlands Airport
- Website: www.westatlantic.eu

West Atlantic UK Limited, formerly Atlantic Airlines Limited is a British cargo airline based at East Midlands Airport. It operates contract and ad hoc cargo flights worldwide, especially within Europe as part of the West Atlantic Group. The company's fleet is composed of Boeing 737 aircraft. The airline specialises in the transport of dangerous goods and radioactive products and other specialist aerial work, including oil spill response, dispersant spraying and icing trials. The prime activity of the business is the supply and operating of aircraft to night-time freight integrators and consolidators and the operation of ad hoc air charters on behalf of other airlines, freight brokers and forwarders. Atlantic Airlines merged with the Swedish airline West Air Europe in 2008 to establish the West Atlantic Group.

West Atlantic UK holds an EU Ops Air Operators Certificate with the United Kingdom Civil Aviation Authority and a Type A Operating Licence, permitting it to carry cargo and mail on aircraft.

== History ==
The airline was established in 1994. It was formed by Air Atlantique to specialise in the supply of contract and ad hoc cargo services. Since July 2001 West Atlantic UK has traded independently and continues to broaden its product range and capability through the marketing of its Air Operators Certificate (AOC).

The company Atlantic Airlines Limited was established in March 2001 when the management performed a buy-in to the trading company. A full management buy out was completed on 28 May 2004 when the same management purchased all the assets of the business, including aircraft, spares, and engines.

In January 2006, Atlantic acquired the first of an order for five BAe ATP freighter aircraft. In February 2008, Atlantic Airlines signed an agreement with BAE Systems Regional Aircraft to long-term lease a further six BAe ATP freighters, bringing the total orders to 11.

In October 2008, it was announced that the airline would merge with West Air Sweden to form a new airline called West Atlantic with its headquarters in Sweden.

On 8 December 2009, Atlantic Airlines' biggest base, Coventry Airport, was closed for financial reasons, causing Atlantic Airlines to cease all cargo flights to and from the airport. Atlantic Airlines moved all Coventry flights to Birmingham on a temporary basis as a result. The airline recommenced operations out of Coventry when it reopened after it was bought by Peter Rigby.

On 27 April 2013, Atlantic Airlines retired the last Lockheed L188 Electra from its fleet in cargo service. Atlantic Airlines was the last operator of the type outside of Canada. Subsequently, most of the fleet was sold and transferred to Buffalo Airways in Canada. In 2015 Atlantic Airline transferred its ATP fleet to the West Atlantic group Swedish AOC to focus on further Boeing 737 acquisitions.

In June 2017 West Atlantic announced that it would be the launch customer and first operator of the Boeing 737-800BCF .

In November 2017, following the cease of operations from Coventry Airport, It set up new airline offices to the south of Coventry Airport and relocated its Operational and Line Maintenance Control Centre to East Midlands Airport. The airline leased space inside Hangar 29 at East Midlands Airport to provide maintenance facilities for their aircraft. On 31 October 2017 Atlantic Airlines changed its name to West Atlantic UK Limited.

In November 2020 West Atlantic added its first ATR72 to its fleet from sister airline Swiftair to operate between East Midlands Airport and Guernsey Airport for DHL Air UK.

By September 2022, West Atlantic had phased out the BAe ATP from its UK network, following the addition of more ATR 72s to their fleet. In 2025 West Atlantic phased out the last Boeing 737-300 and began replacing them with Boeing 737 NGs in anticipation of having a fully NG fleet by 2030.

== Destinations ==
West Atlantic UK serves daily the following destinations:

- Crown Dependencies
  - Jersey - Jersey Airport
  - Guernsey - Guernsey Airport
- United Kingdom
  - England
    - East Midlands - East Midlands Airport
    - Exeter - Exeter Airport
  - Northern Ireland
    - Belfast International
  - Scotland
    - Aberdeen - Aberdeen Airport
    - Edinburgh - Edinburgh Airport
    - Glasgow - Glasgow Prestwick Airport (seasonal)

== Fleet ==
=== Current fleet ===
As of August 2025, West Atlantic UK operates the following aircraft:

West Atlantic UK fleet
Aircraft	In service
ATR72	1
Boeing 737-400F	5
Boeing 737-800BCF	6
Total	10

=== Former fleet ===
West Atlantic UK previously operated the following aircraft:

DC-6: G-SIXC

- British Aerospace ATP-F
- Lockheed Electra
- Convair CV-440 (for some reason it couldn't be registered in the UK, so while it was owned by them, and even painted in a full livery, it never actually flew)
- Boeing 737-300

== Accidents and incidents ==
- On 19 January 2021, a West Atlantic Boeing 737-400 freighter suffered a very hard landing at Exeter Airport, causing many creases in the fuselage. The aircraft was written off and scrapped on-site
