= West Air Sweden =

Swedish airline

IATA	ICAO	Call sign
T2	SWN	AIR SWEDEN
- Founded: 1955; 71 years ago
- Hubs: Charles de Gaulle Airport Oslo Airport, Gardermoen
- Fleet size: 3
- Parent company: West Atlantic Group
- Headquarters: Malmö, Sweden
- Website: westatlantic.eu

West Air Sweden, operating as West Atlantic, is a cargo airline based in Malmö, Sweden. It operates scheduled and ad hoc freight charter services for FedEx, DHL and UPS. It is also contracted to operate mail flights for different postal services within Europe. Its main bases are Charles de Gaulle Airport and Oslo Airport, Gardermoen.

== History ==
Since 2011 the airline has been part of the West Atlantic Group along with British cargo airline West Atlantic UK.

== Fleet ==
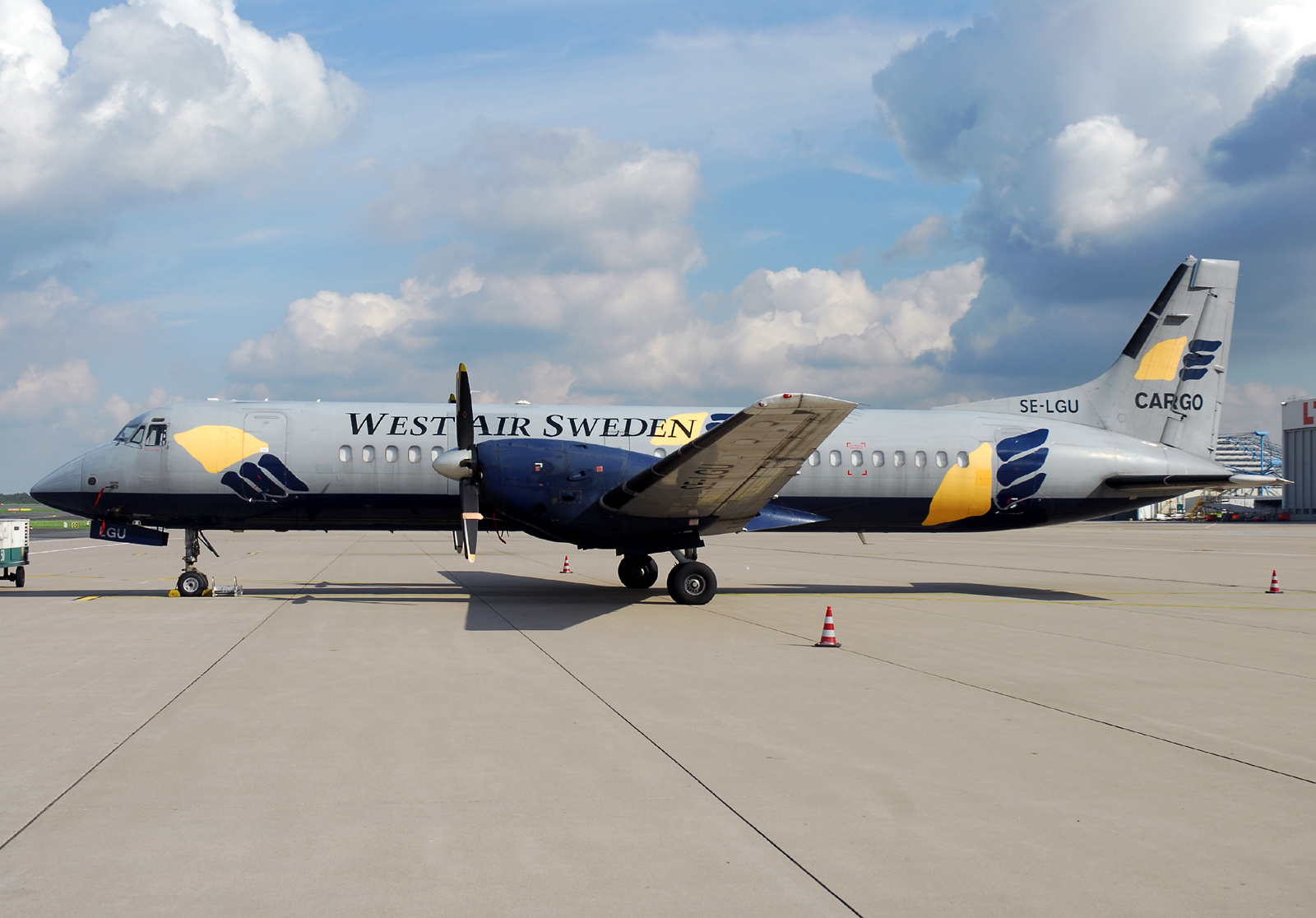
West Air Sweden British Aerospace ATP

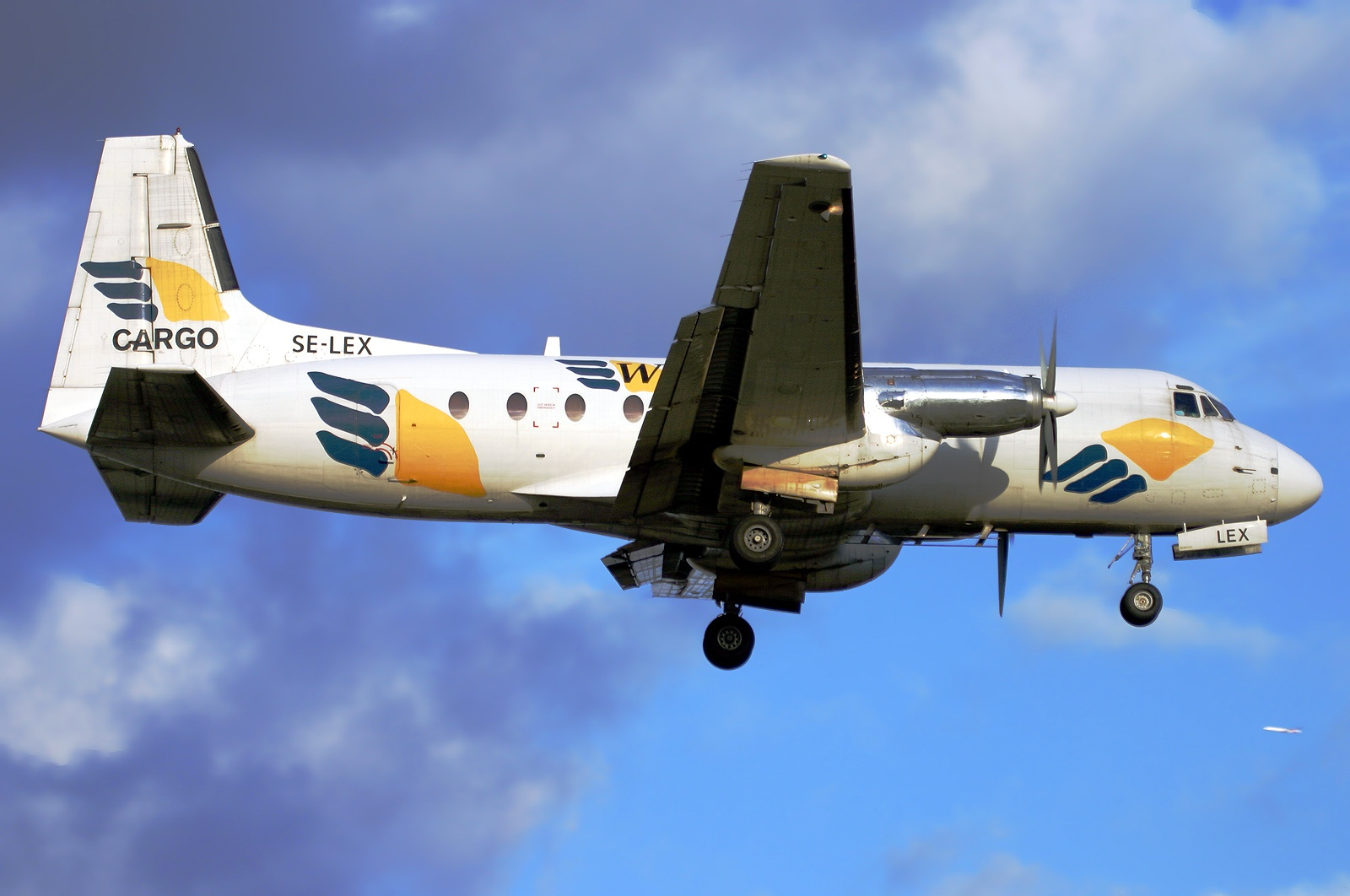
West Air Sweden Hawker Siddeley HS 748

=== Current fleet ===
As of February 2024, the West Air Sweden fleet consists of the following aircraft:

West Air Sweden fleet
Aircraft	In service
Boeing 737-800BCF	1
Boeing 757-200	1
Total	3

=== Former fleet ===
West Air Sweden has previously operated the following aircraft:

- Hawker Siddeley HS 748
- ATR 72
- BAe ATP
- Bombardier CRJ-200

== Accidents and incidents ==
On 8 January 2016, West Air Sweden Flight 294, a Bombardier CRJ200 was operating a cargo flight from Oslo Airport, Gardermoen to Tromsø Airport, when it lost radar contact shortly after declaring an emergency at 23:31Z. The aircraft was later located having impacted the side of a mountain northwest of Lake Akkajaure about 10 km from the border of Norway in mountainous area without road access. The flight was carrying 4.5 tons of mail and parcels. Both pilots were killed in the accident.
