= British Aerospace ATP =

Regional airliner produced by British Aerospace

ATP

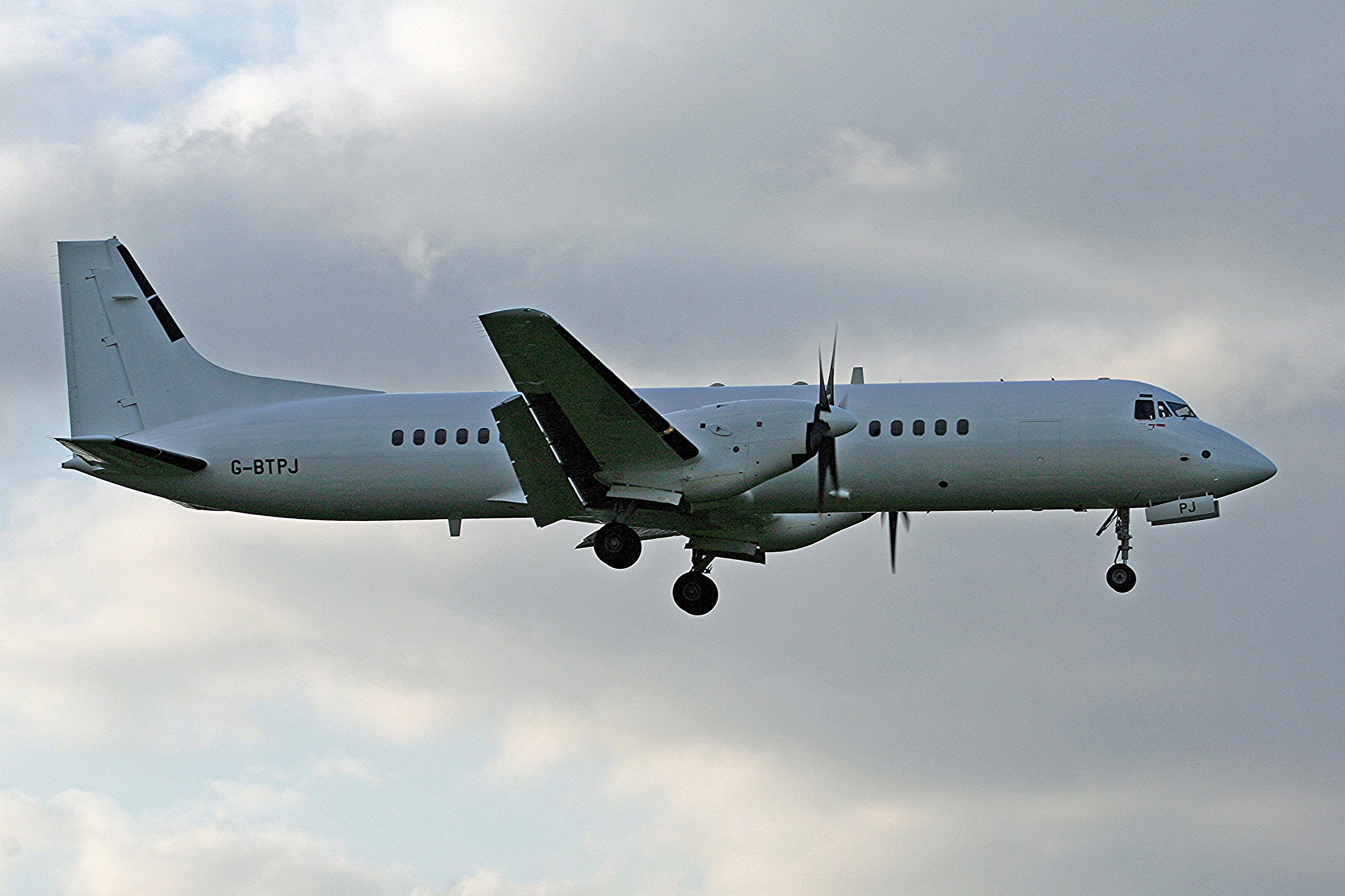
- British Aerospace ATP

General information
- Type: Airliner
- National origin: United Kingdom
- Manufacturer: British Aerospace (now BAE Systems)
- Status: Retired
- Primary user: British Airways (formerly) Manx Airlines (formerly) United Express (formerly) West Air Sweden (formerly)
- Number built: 65

History
- Manufactured: 1988–1996
- Introduction date: 1988
- First flight: 6 August 1986
- Retired: 9 May 2025 (type certification withdrawn)
- Developed from: Hawker Siddeley HS 748

The British Aerospace ATP (Advanced Turbo-Prop) is a retired turboprop airliner designed and produced by British Aerospace. It was an evolution of the Hawker Siddeley HS 748, a feederliner of the 1960s.

The ATP was developed during the 1980s; events such as the 1979 oil crisis and increasing public concern regarding aircraft noise led business planners at British Aerospace to believe that there was a market for a short-range, low-noise, fuel-efficient turboprop aircraft. First flown on 6 August 1986, by the time it became commercially available, the market segment it fell within was already hotly contested by multiple other airliners, such as the de Havilland Canada Dash 8, ATR 42, and ATR 72. Amid this intense competition, sales of the ATP were limited, leading British Aerospace to terminate production after only eight years, during which a total of 65 aircraft were completed.

The final European operator of the ATP, West Air Sweden, made a final repositioning flight on 24 February 2023. This marked the end of the type's primary active service.

In July 2025, BAE systems voluntarily surrendered the type certificate for the aircraft. This subsequently forced the last operator, Encomm Airlines, to retire their fleet, thus marking the end of service for the airframe. The fate of the remaining airframes has not been confirmed.

== Design and development ==
=== Background ===
The origins of the ATP can be traced back to, in part, the 1979 oil crisis, which had caused dramatic rises in fuel prices; there was considerable attention paid to the possibility of another such event, thus operators came to place greater value on the fuel efficiency of their aircraft. Another factor that had gained prominence around this time was noise pollution. Recognising these trends, British Aerospace decided that it would assign a design team to produce an airliner, suitable for short- to medium-haul operations, that would be both more fuel efficient and quieter than the prior generations of aircraft.

It was quickly decided that a development of the existing Hawker Siddeley HS 748 airliner would be the preferred option. The airframe was redesigned with a lengthened 26.01 metres (85.3 ft) fuselage and a larger 30.62 metres (100.5 ft) wing span. the airliner was originally designed to accommodate 64 passengers, although the actual capacity could change considerably dependent on customer configuration, and was sized to slot between the original HS 748's capacity of 50 seats and the jet-powered British Aerospace 146's capacity of 100 seats. The aircraft was also designed to be compliant with the latest regulations pertaining to air travel in both Europe and the United States.

The cockpit was also redesigned to ease pilot workload using measures such as colour-coded instrumentation and a centralised fault warning panel. Equipped with digital avionics and multifunction displays, it was considered to be a glass cockpit. Various other minor modifications were performed across the airframe, such as the reshaping of areas such as the more pointed nose, the tail unit's swept fin and rudder, and revised wingtips. Furthermore, the windows were reduced in size and had a shorter pitch than those of the HS 748. There was a 30% commonality between the two aircraft.

The propulsion was significantly revised from that of the HS 748; the twin Rolls-Royce Dart turboprop engines of its predecessor were substituted for Pratt & Whitney Canada PW126 engines, a more modern counterpart. Each engine drove a custom-designed six-blade propeller jointly developed by British Aerospace and the American specialist Hamilton Standard. These large diameter propellers were designed to turn slower than traditional equivalents to generate less noise; their distance from the fuselage meant that passengers were subject to noise levels comparable to contemporary jetliners. The airliner was also relatively lightweight, weighing only 468 pounds per seat, which was reportedly less than any other regional airliner in its size category in the mid-1980s. Partially as a result of these refinements, the aircraft's cruise speed was increased considerably over that of its predecessor. The project's existence was revealed to the public in early 1984.

=== Into flight ===
On 6 August 1986, the prototype ATP performed its maiden flight from Manchester Airport, flown by test pilot Robby Robinson. This initial flight, which lasted several hours, was relatively non-notable, except for adverse weather conditions being present for the type's first landing. At the time of this first flight, the company expected the ATP to enter revenue service during 1987.

Between 1987 and 2002, BAe reportedly held ambitions to sell around 300 ATPs. It proved to be far more economic than preceding aircraft used for the role, such as the BAC 1-11 and the Douglas DC9 jetliners. However, throughout the ATP's production run, the regional airline market was hotly contested by numerous companies, including the Dutch aircraft company Fokker, Canadian transport manufacturer Bombardier, and the European specialist ATR. This led to BAe investigating potential partnerships amongst its competitors, ultimately resulting in the short-lived merger of its regional airliner manufacturing division with ATR under the name Aero International (Regional) on 26 January 1995.

Assembly of the type was largely undertaken at BAe's Woodford and Prestwick facilities, while the manufacture of both the airframe and wings was performed at the Chadderton plant. During mid 1997, BAe announced that production of the ATP was permanently terminated; work at the Prestwick was promptly shifted to the aerostructures sector. By this point, a total of 65 aircraft had been completed.

During July 2000, a project was announced that resulted in the conversion of existing aircraft into the ATP Freighter (ATPF) configuration, which was promoted to cargo operators. Outfitted with a modified freight door derived from that of the HS 748, the ATPF can carry 30% more cargo than its predecessor with a 10% increase in running costs. Under this programme, an initial batch of six ATPs were converted into freighter on behalf of the cargo airline West Air Sweden.

== Operational history ==
During 1988, the ATP entered commercial service with the regional airline British Midland. Numerous British airliners were quick to adopt and operate the type, including British Airways, Loganair, and British Regional Airlines. During the 1990s, various charter operators also adopted small fleets of ATPs. The air ferry company British World Airlines also opted to acquire several ATPs in a quick change configuration.

During the late 1990s, the Scandinavian airline Sun-Air initiated a long-term plan to introduce jet-powered airliners into its fleet by 2000; as a step towards this, and to help handle increasing passenger traffic on its routes between Denmark and Britain, the company acquired a pair of second-hand ATPs during late 1997; further aircraft would follow. Around the same timeframe, the Spanish operator Air Europa Express became a sizable user of the type; in August 1998, it announced its intention to double its ATP fleet from six to 12 aircraft.

Early sales efforts had been particularly focused on the North American market, BAE reportedly held negotiations with numerous carriers across the continent; the first success was an order for five ATPs from the Canadian carrier Avline. In September 1987, the American operator Wings West Airlines announced that it had picked the ATP as the winner of an international competition; the initial order for 10 airliners represented the ATP's breakthrough into the lucrative US market. Carl Albert, President and Chief Executive of Wings West, stated that the ATP was superior to its closest competitors, such as the De Havilland Canada Dash 8 and the Fokker 50, and claimed it offered the lowest seat-mile costs of any turboprop airliner. In practice, the only U.S. operator of the ATP in scheduled passenger service was Air Wisconsin, which flew as United Express on behalf of United Airlines via a code sharing agreement.

During the mid-2000s, the ATP was being increasingly used to carry aerial freight with numerous operators. By December 2021, 12 aircraft reportedly remained in commercial service as cargo aircraft with West Air Sweden (10) and Deraya (2).

== End of service ==
By 2023, most operators of the ATP had retired the ageing fleet, pursuing more modern aircraft. The remaining active airframes were scattered around East Africa, mostly in Kenya.

BAE systems surrendered the type certificate in 2025, there was criticism from Kenyan operator EnComm Aviation, who used the type delivering aid for the World Food Program across east Africa. Since this has happened, Encomm's legal representatives are currently in dispute with BAE systems to challenge the removal of certification. With the certificate withdrawn, the aircraft can no longer fly and is now grounded permanently.

== Variants ==
Several ATP variants were proposed and produced for civil and military use:

Jetstream 61

The British Aerospace Jetstream 61 was an improved derivative of the ATP. It featured an interior based on the Jetstream 41, with innovative cabin wall armrests and an increase in capacity from 64 to 70 seats. In addition, the airframe incorporated more powerful PW127 engines and increased weights and range.

For Farnborough, the original prototype ATP (serial number 2001) was re-painted in a J61 scheme and re-registered G-PLXI (LXI being the Roman numeral for 61. The first flight of a proper J61 aircraft was by 2064 G-JLXI on 10 May 1994 from Prestwick. Four airframes were produced as Jetstream 61s, 2065 being the only other to have flown before British Aerospace's regional airliner manufacturing operations were merged with ATR as Aero International (Regional) on 26 January 1995. With the already highly successful ATR 72 now part of the same product range, the Jetstream 61 was immediately cancelled with all four airframes being scrapped at Prestwick.

Maritime ATP

This was a variant for use in military naval operations, with a surveillance radar under the forward fuselage, nose-mounted FLIR and internal sonar buoys. A suite of special crew stations also featured, as did a choice of up to six weapon pylons under the wings and fuselage. The Maritime ATP was later known as the BAe P.132. None were built.

ATP-AEW

The AEW was a 1986 proposal for an Airborne Early Warning aircraft for Australia, with two EMI Skymaster radars in nose and tail radomes, similar in appearance to the Nimrod AEW.3. None were built.

== Former Operators ==
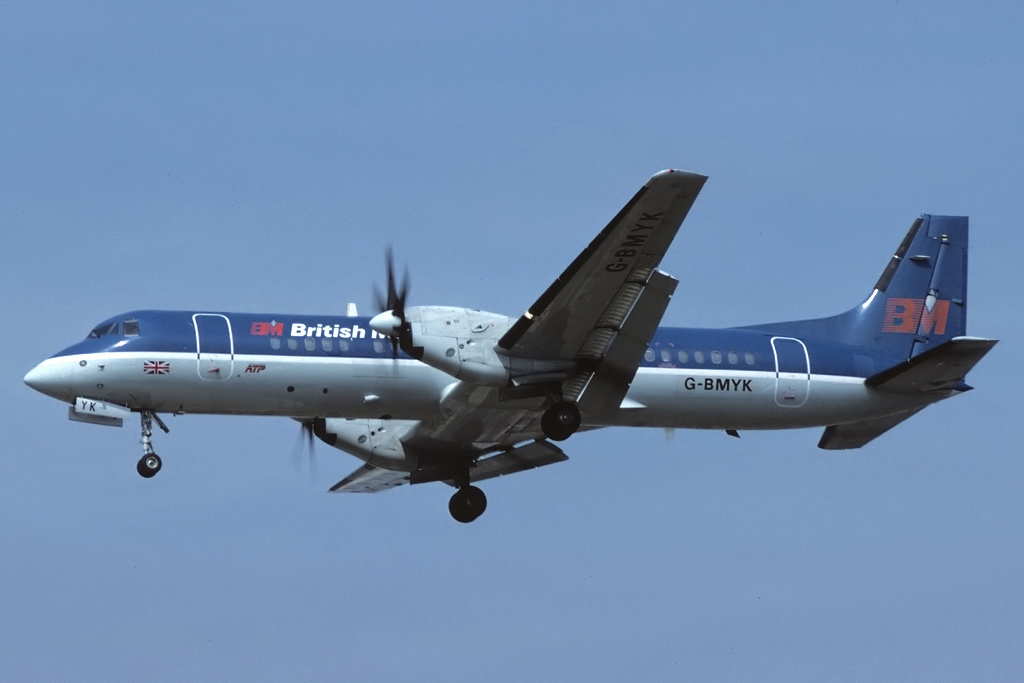
British Midland ATP in 1993

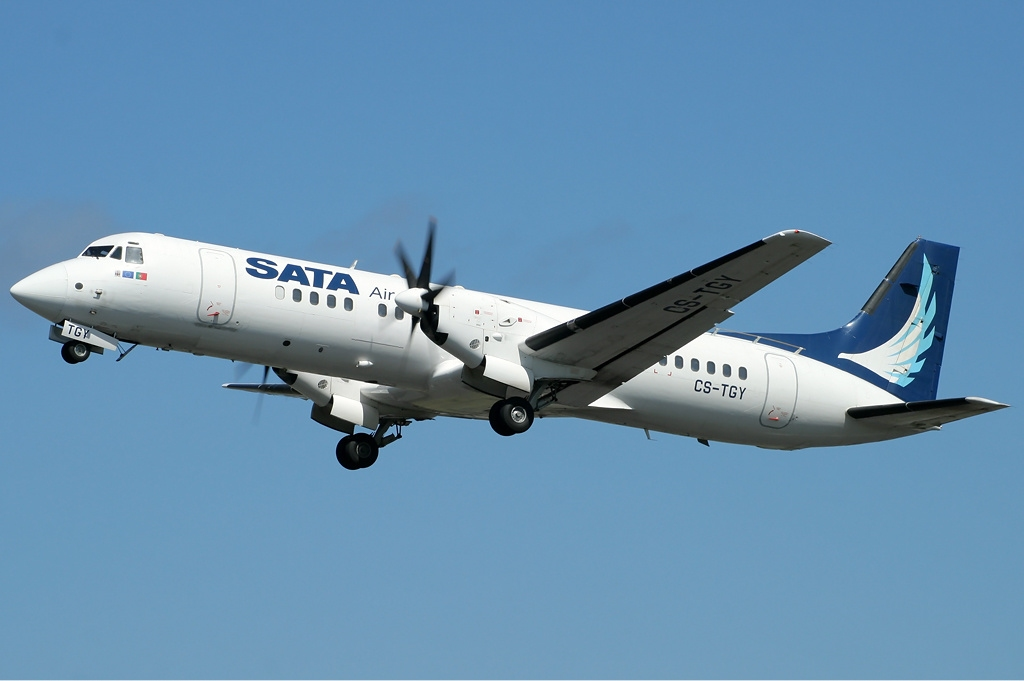
SATA Air Açores ATP in 2009

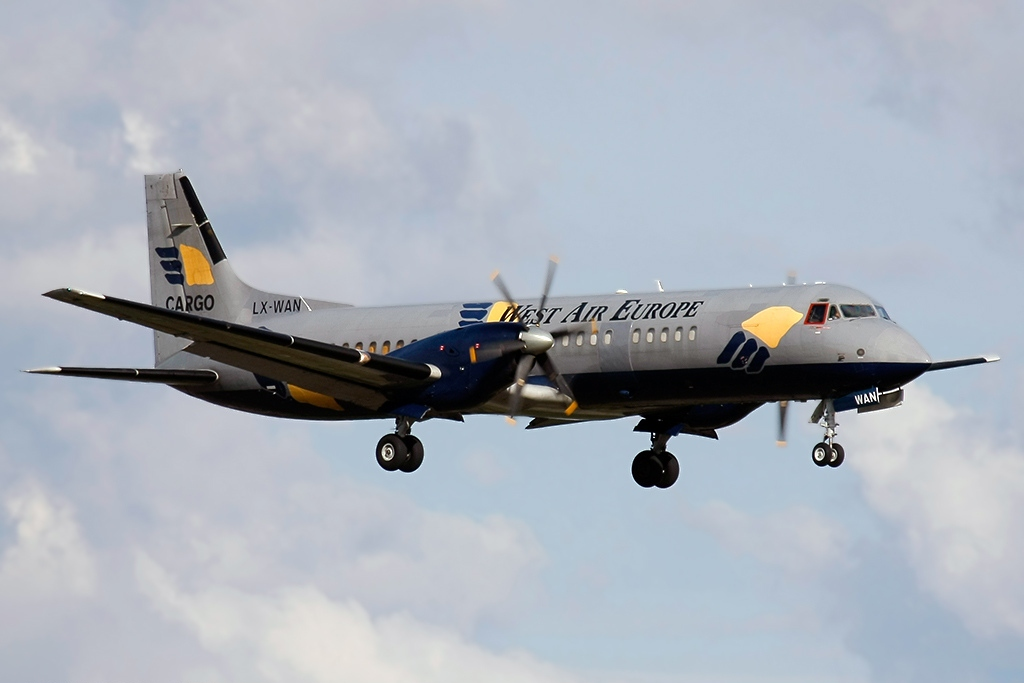
West Air Sweden ATP in 2011

The following airlines formerly operated British Aerospace ATP aircraft:

- Air Europa Express (operated for Air Europa)
- Airgo Airlines
- Air Ostrava
- Air Wisconsin (operated for United Express)
- Asian Spirit
- Biman Bangladesh Airlines
- British Airways
- British Midland
- British World Airlines
- Canarias Regional Air
- Deraya Air Taxi
- Encomm Airlines (last known operator)
- EuroAir
- Eurodirect
- First Flight Couriers
- Loganair
- Manx Airlines
- Merpati Nusantara Airlines
- NextJet
- SATA Air Açores
- Sun Air of Scandinavia (operated for British Airways)
- Turkish Air Transport (Türk Hava Taşımacılığı)
- United Feeder Service (operated for United Express)
- West Air Sweden
- West Atlantic

== Notable accidents and incidents ==
- On 19 April 1997, Merpati Nusantara Airlines Flight 106 lost control at 2,000 feet on approach to Tanjung Pandan Airport in Indonesia. 15 people died and 43 survived, making it the second-worst accident involving an ATP. It was the first fatal incident involving the type within its first ten years of service.
- On 11 December 1999, SATA Air Açores Flight 530M crashed into a mountain on São Jorge Island in the Azores, Portugal during a short haul flight. All 35 passengers and crew on board died in the crash. The accident was the worst air accident involving the ATP. It was confirmed that the crew were disorientated in the midst of low clouds over São Jorge Island and made a controlled flight into terrain.

== Surviving aircraft ==
As of January 2024, there are six retired airframes that are either preserved or re-purposed. These are as follows:

- G-11-068: This aircraft was never completed and its fuselage has remained at Glasgow Prestwick Airport since. It is now used as an airport fire training platform.
- G-11-071: This aircraft was also never completed and was used as a smoke training platform at Woodford Aerodrome. Following the site’s closure, it was re-located to nearby Manchester Airport where it is used for similar purposes.
- SE-MHF: This aircraft was partially dismantled in 2021 at Isle of Man Airport. It only consists of its fuselage and wings up to the engine mounts. It is used as an airport fire training platform.
- SE-LHX (displayed as G-MAUD): This aircraft is on display at the Manx Aviation and Military Museum, Isle of Man Airport. It has used various salvaged parts from other scrapped airframes and has been restored in an original Manx Airlines livery. It also now bears the registration G-MAUD, although the actual G-MAUD was scrapped. It is the only ATP on display in near-complete condition.
- PK-DGA: Partially scrapped, the fuselage is currently being used as a restaurant in East Java, Indonesia.
- SE-LPU: Partially preserved, used for airport fire training at Coventry Airport, UK.

== Specifications ==
Data from Jane's All the World's Aircraft, 1988–1989

General characteristics

- Crew: Four, comprising two pilots and two flight attendants
- Capacity: 64 passengers
- Length: 26.00 m (85 ft 4 in)
- Wingspan: 30.63 m (100 ft 6 in)
- Height: 7.14 m (23 ft 5 in)
- Wing area: 78.3 m^{2} (843 sq ft)
- Empty weight: 13,595 kg (29,972 lb)
- Max takeoff weight: 22,930 kg (50,552 lb)
- Fuel capacity: 6,364 L (1,400 imp gal; 1,681 US gal)
- Powerplant: 2 × Pratt & Whitney Canada PW126 turboprops, 1,978 kW (2,653 shp) each
- Propellers: 6-bladed BAe/Hamilton Standard, 4.19 m (13 ft 9 in) diameter

Performance

- Cruise speed: 496 km/h (308 mph, 268 kn) at 4,575 m (15,000 ft)
- Range: 1,825 km (1,134 mi, 985 nmi) with 64 passengers
- Ferry range: 4,070 km (2,530 mi, 2,200 nmi)
- Service ceiling: 7,600 m (25,000 ft) (max operating altitude)

== See also ==
Related development

- Hawker Siddeley HS 748
- Hawker Siddeley Andover

Aircraft of comparable role, configuration, and era

- ATR 72
- de Havilland Canada Dash 8
- Ilyushin Il-114
- Saab 2000

Related lists

- List of civil aircraft
