= West Air Sweden Flight 294 =

2016 aviation accident in Sweden

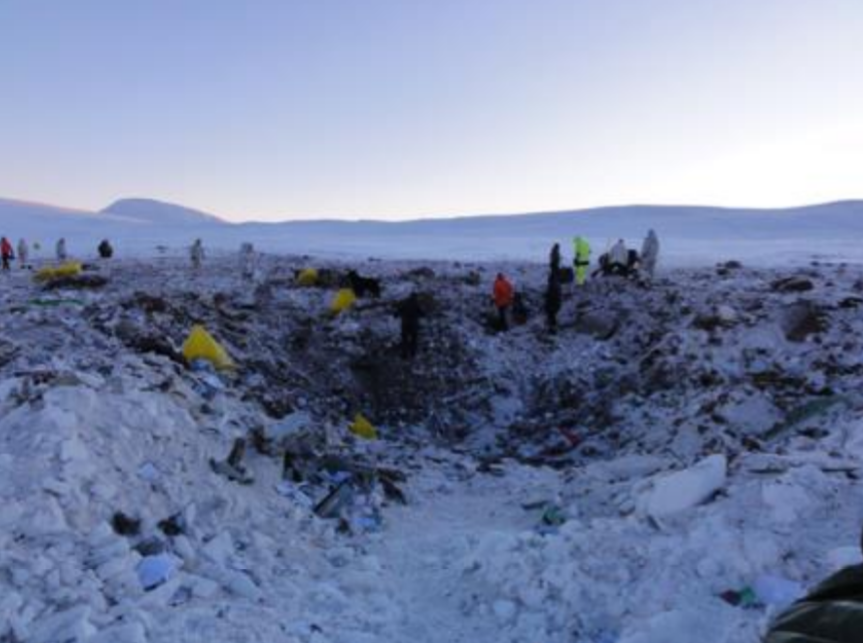
- The crash site of the aircraft

Accident
- Date: 8 January 2016
- Summary: Instrument failure followed by improper reaction and spatial disorientation, leading to pilot error and loss of control
- Site: Near Akkajaure, Sweden; 67°43′N 16°54′E

Aircraft
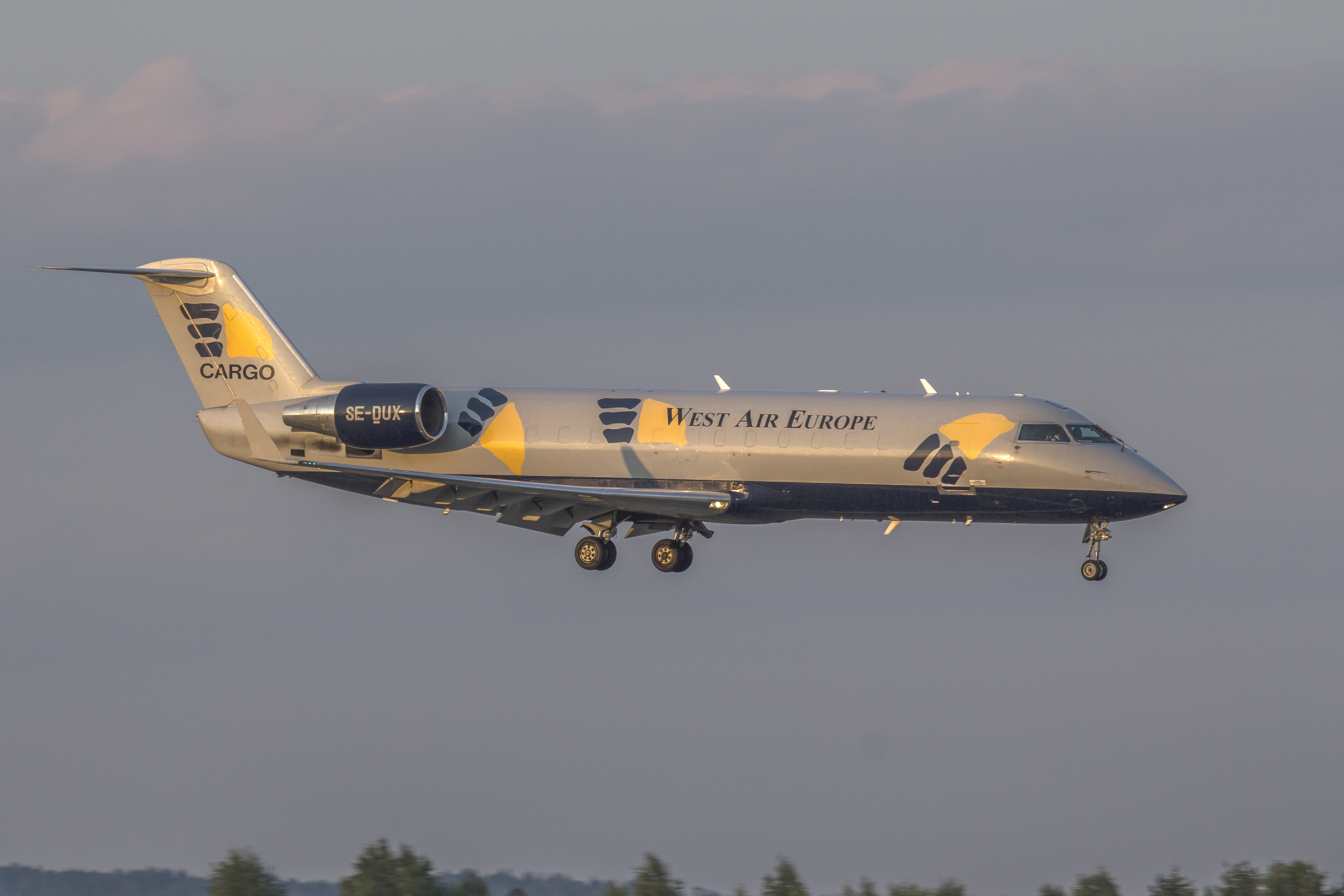
- SE-DUX, the aircraft involved in the accident, seen in 2014
- Aircraft type: Bombardier CRJ200
- Operator: West Air Sweden
- IATA flight No.: PT294
- ICAO flight No.: SWN294
- Call sign: AIR SWEDEN 294
- Registration: SE-DUX
- Flight origin: Oslo Airport, Gardermoen, Oslo, Norway
- Destination: Tromsø Airport, Tromsø, Norway
- Occupants: 2
- Crew: 2
- Fatalities: 2
- Survivors: 0

West Air Sweden Flight 294 was a cargo flight of a Bombardier CRJ200 from Oslo to Tromsø, Norway, that crashed on 8 January 2016. A malfunction in one of the inertial reference units had produced erroneous attitude indications on one of the instrument displays. The crew's subsequent response resulted in spatial disorientation, leading to the loss of control of the aircraft. Both crew members on board were killed.

== Aircraft and crew ==
The aircraft was built in 1993 as a CRJ-100 and was operated by Lufthansa CityLine as D‑ACLE until 2006. It had a manufacturer's serial number (MSN) of 7010 and had two General Electric CF34-3B1 engines. At the time of the accident, it had accumulated more than 38,600 flight hours and 31,000 flight cycles.

The 42‑year‑old Spanish captain had around 3,200 flying hours, of which 2,016 were on this aircraft type; the 33‑year‑old French first officer had 3,050 flying hours, of which 900 were on this aircraft type.

== Flight ==
Map of Norway with location of the crash site, between the departure airport (Oslo) and intended destination (Tromsø).

The aircraft departed Oslo-Gardermoen Airport at 23:11 hours local time for a flight to Tromsø Airport. The aircraft carried 4.5 tonnes (4,500 kg; 9,900 lb) of mail. The aircraft was in cruise at flight level 330 (nominal 33,000 feet [10,058 m]) before the aircraft transmitted a Mayday call at approximately 00:31, after which communications and radar contact with the flight were lost by air traffic control.

Aircraft tracking service Flightradar24 reported that the aircraft fell 21,275 feet (6,485 m) within 60 seconds, corresponding to a mean vertical speed of 355 ft/s (108 m/s) at 00:18, based upon data transmitted by the aircraft's transponder.

== Search ==
Both Norwegian and Swedish authorities searched for the aircraft, discovering the wreckage at 03:10 in the morning. The accident site was located at an elevation of 1,000 metres (3,300 ft) in a remote area near Lake Akkajaure in Sweden, approximately 10 kilometres (6.2 mi; 5.4 nmi) from the Norwegian border. The aircraft remains were spread in a circle approximately 50 metres (160 ft) in diameter, which was said to suggest a high‑energy impact.

== Investigation ==
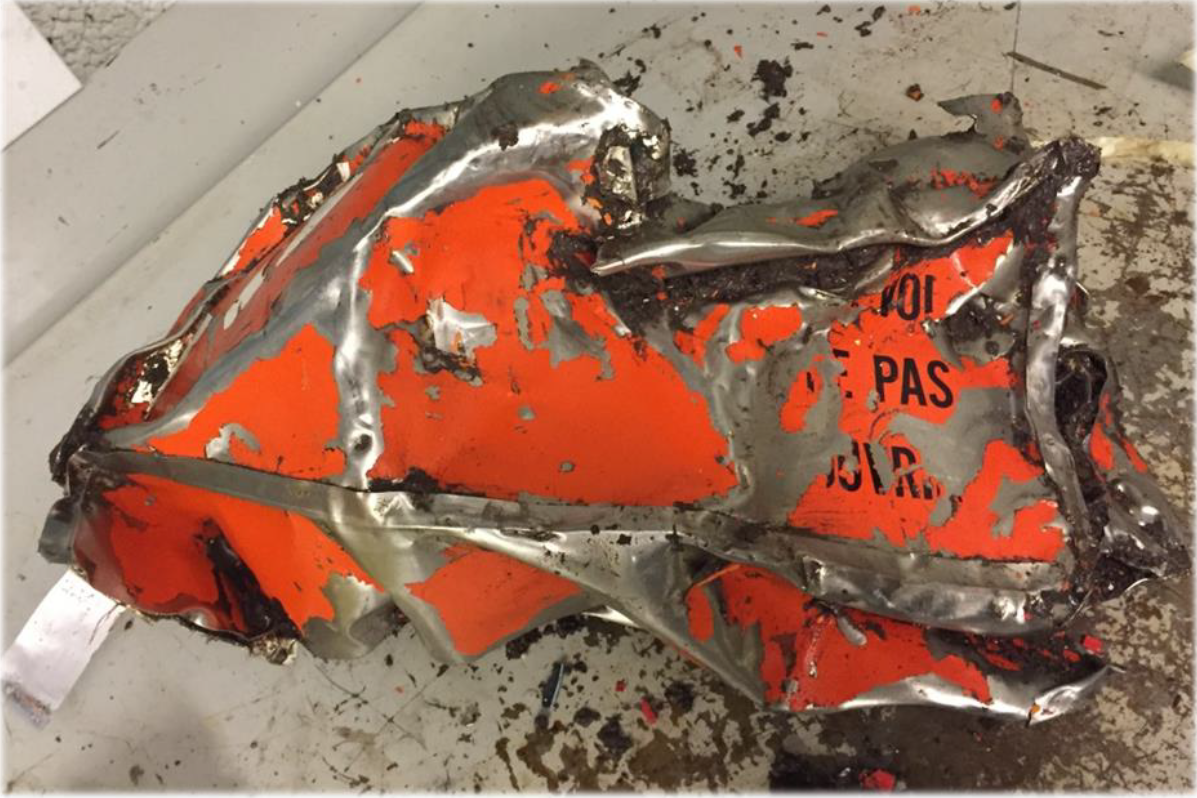
The digital flight data recorder from West Air Sweden Flight 294. All data was collected, even though the rest of the aircraft was heavily fragmented

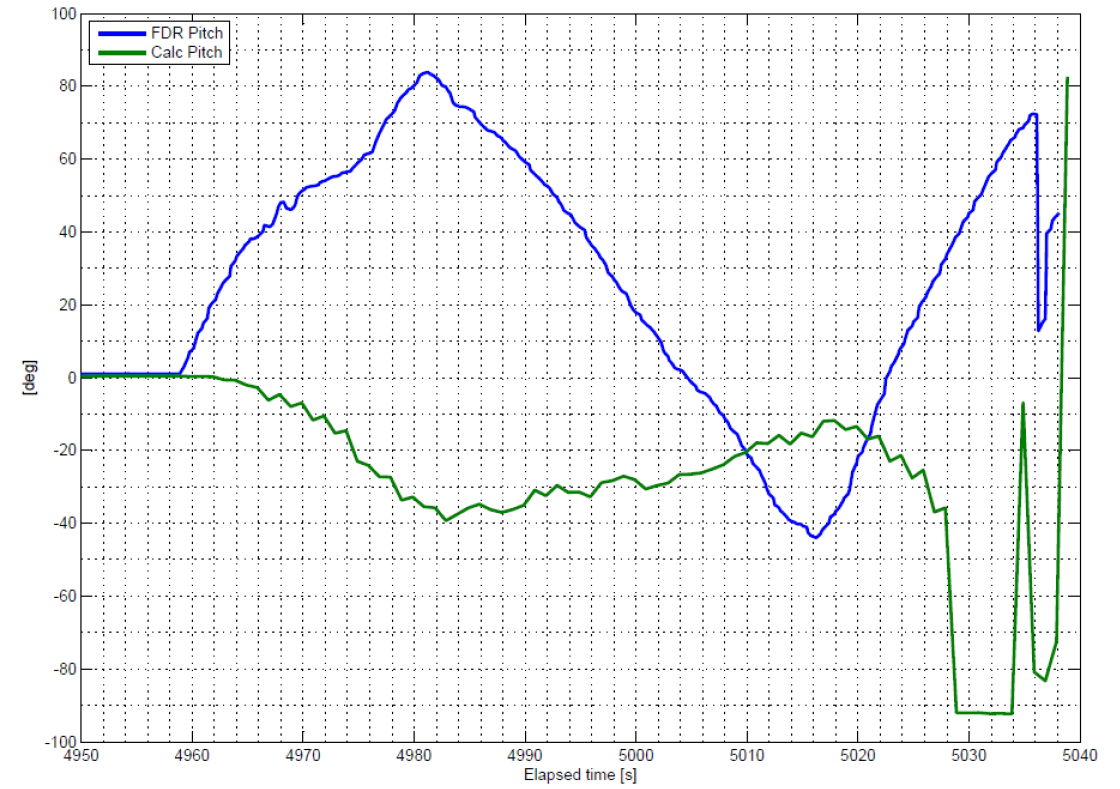
The difference between the pitch angle data provided by the FDR and the calculated pitch angle data.

The Swedish Accident Investigation Authority (Swedish: Statens Haverikommission, or SHK) opened an investigation into the accident. On 9 January 2016, the flight data recorder (FDR) was found severely damaged as well as parts of the Cockpit Voice Recorder (CVR). The CVR was, however, not intact, and the part containing the memory functions was missing. The following day, the missing parts of the CVR were found, alongside human remains. On 12 January, SHK reported that the distress call from the pilots contained the word "Mayday" repeated, with no further information. On 26 January, Statens Haverikommission reported that they had managed to read both CVR and FDR, and were analysing and validating the recordings.

On 19 March, in their interim report, SHK revealed:

After 17 seconds from the start of the event, the maximum speed (VMO) of 315 knots (583 km/h; 362 mph) was exceeded. The overspeed warning was activated and the vertical acceleration turned to positive values.

Another 16 seconds later, the first officer transmitted a "MAYDAY" message that was confirmed by air traffic control. The indicated airspeed then exceeded 400 knots (740 km/h; 460 mph) and the stabiliser trim was reactivated and reduced to 0.3 degrees nose down. The Pilot in Command called "Mach trim" after which engine power was reduced to idle.

During the further event, the last valid FDR value shows that the speed continued to increase up to 508 knots (941 km/h; 585 mph) while the vertical acceleration values were positive, with maximum values of approximately +3G. FDR data shows that the aircraft's ailerons and spoilerons mainly were deflected to the left during the event.

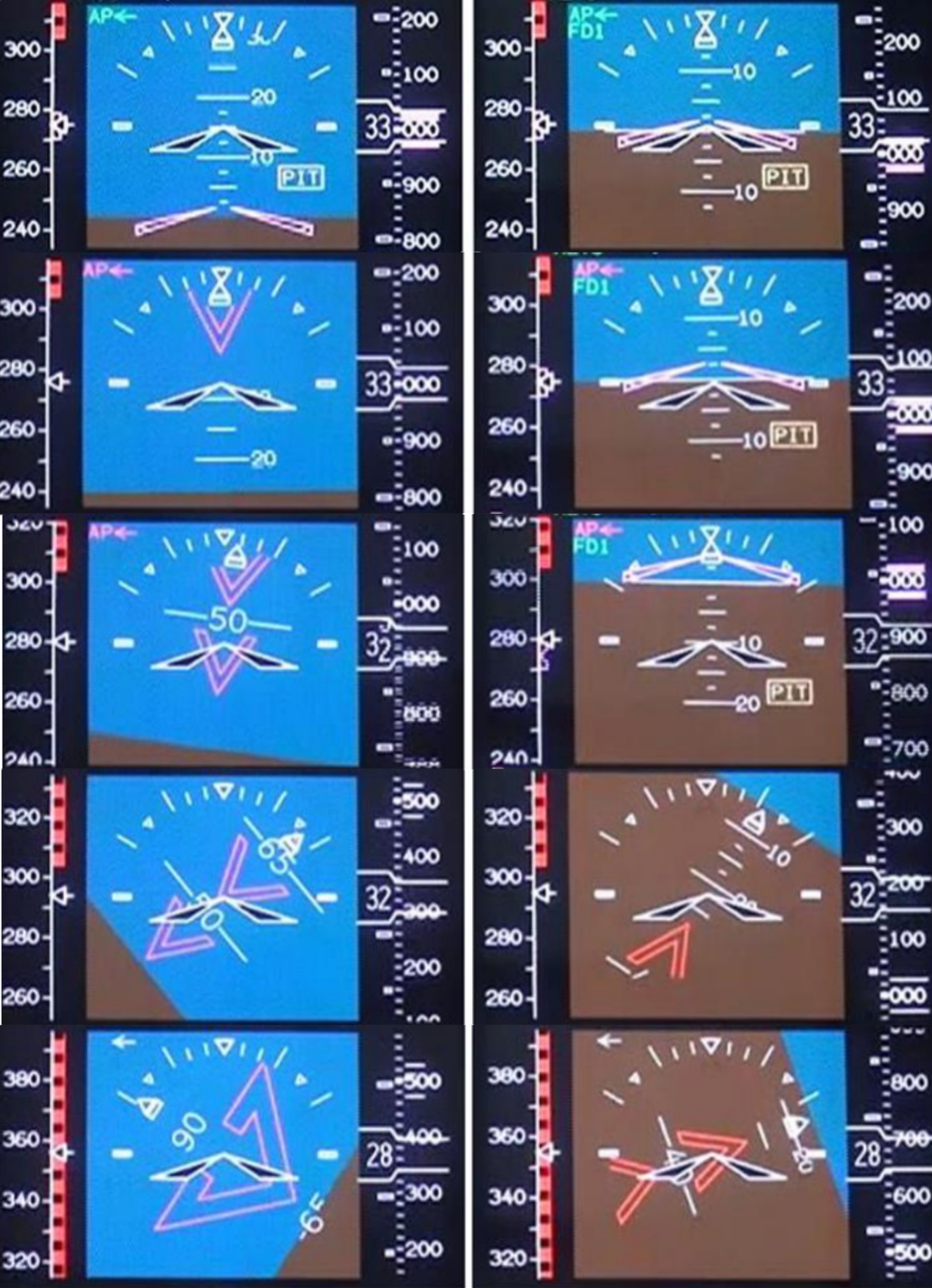
Reconstruction of the captain's (left) and first officer's (right) primary flight displays. The captain's PFD is giving erroneous information

Investigators discovered that the inertial reference unit (IRU; which provides information to the flight crew's instruments) no. 1 (connected to the captain's instruments and the flight data recorder) had malfunctioned in-flight (the SHK was unable to determine the cause of the malfunction), causing the captain's artificial horizon to display a nose-up pitch, when in fact the aircraft was perfectly level.

The captain responded by pushing the yoke down in an attempt to regain level flight. Instead, the aircraft's nose lowered and it departed level flight. The aircraft then entered a steep dive traveling over 510 knots (940 km/h; 590 mph), nearly inverted, and banked over 40 degrees, causing the "bank angle" warning sounded in the cockpit.

However, this alarm is connected to the inertial unit number 2, which provides information to the first officer's instruments. This indicated that only the captain's instruments had failed and the first officer's were functioning properly, but neither pilots cross-checked their instruments. The first officer, despite having the correct attitude indication displayed, reacted insufficiently.

Unable to find a visual reference as it was nighttime, the pilots became spatially disoriented and were further unable to manage the situation due to high G-loads.

The final report was published by SHK on 12 December 2016. The inquiry reached the following conclusion:

The accident was caused by insufficient operational prerequisites for the management of a failure in a redundant system.

Contributing factors were:

- The absence of an effective system for communication in abnormal and emergency situations.
- The flight instrument system provided insufficient guidance about malfunctions that occurred.
- The initial manoeuver that resulted in negative G-load probably affected the pilots' ability to manage the situation in a rational manner.

The SHK issued 14 safety recommendations.

== In popular culture ==
The accident is featured in the second episode of Season 20 of Mayday, also known as Air Crash Investigation. The episode is titled "Impossible Pitch".

== See also ==
- Spatial disorientation
- Qantas Flight 72
- Copa Airlines Flight 201, another air accident where instrument failure and pilot error combined to cause the plane to dive.
