= West Atlantic =

Airline group

West Air Sweden
IATA	ICAO	Call sign
T2	SWN	AIR SWEDEN
- Founded: 2011
- Fleet size: 3
- Destinations: 12
- Parent company: West Atlantic Group
- Headquarters: Malmö Airport, Sweden
- Key people: Magnus Dahlberg (CEO) Russell Ladkin (CEO)
- Website: www.westatlantic.eu

West Atlantic UK
IATA	ICAO	Call sign
—	NPT	NEPTUNE
- Founded: 2001
- Operating bases: East Midlands Airport Edinburgh Airport
- Fleet size: 16
- Parent company: West Atlantic Group
- Headquarters: East Midlands Airport
- Website: www.westatlantic.eu

West Atlantic is a holding company for two European cargo airlines, West Air Sweden and West Atlantic UK, with its head office in Malmö, Sweden. West Atlantic employ some 650 staff and operate a fleet of 19 aircraft. The airline specializes in the transport of mail, dangerous goods and general cargo.

== History ==
Air Transport Services Group, Inc. announced on 9 December 2013 an agreement to acquire a 25 percent equity interest in West Atlantic. This investment meant the Boeing 767-200 being added into West Atlantic's fleet.

The 767-200 with registration SE-RLA made its first flight on 26 March 2015, and its first commercial flight on the night between 6 and 7 April, with two further 767-200s joining the fleet later in 2015.

On 20 June 2017, West Atlantic announced it will take delivery of four leased Boeing 737-800(BCF) from GE Capital Aviation Services, with the aircraft being delivered between 2017 and 2019.

On 10 April 2019, LUSAT Air S.L. signed an agreement with West Atlantic to become the new majority shareholder in return for a €20 million cash injection.

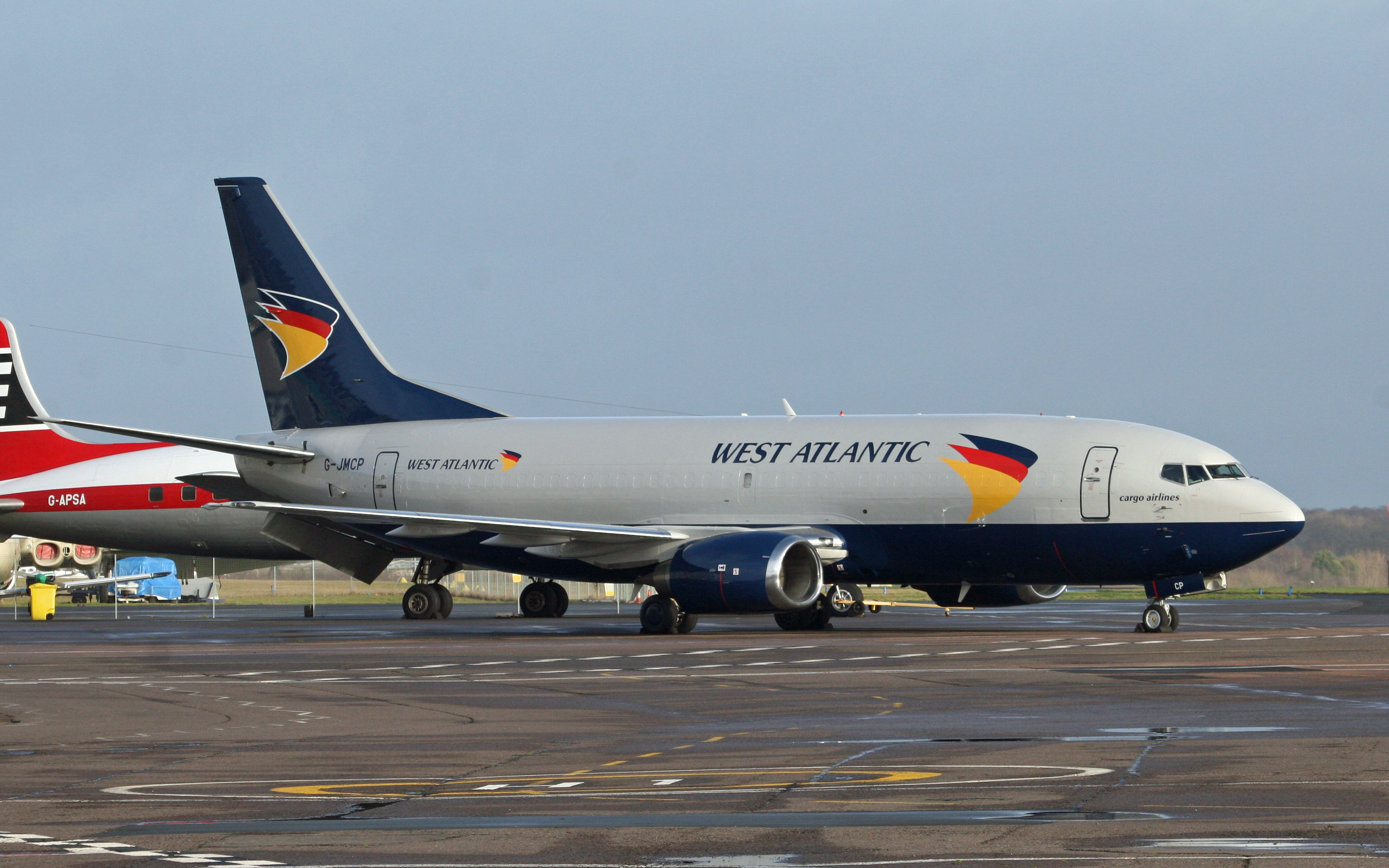
A West Atlantic UK 737-300F

== Fleet ==
As of September 2024, the West Atlantic group fleet includes the following aircraft:

West Atlantic Group Fleet
Aircraft	In service
ATR 72	3
Boeing 737-300F	1
Boeing 737-400F	6
Boeing 737-800F	4
Boeing 757-200	1
Total	15

== Accidents and incidents ==
- On 8 January 2016, a West Atlantic CRJ200 operating as SWN294 from Oslo to Tromsø crashed close to the Norwegian border, by Lake Akkajaure in the Swedish Lapplandsfjällen. The two pilots, a Captain aged 42 and First Officer aged 34, the only persons on board the aircraft at the time, both died in the accident.
- On 19 January 2021, a West Atlantic Boeing 737-400 freighter suffered a very hard landing at Exeter Airport, causing many creases in the fuselage. The aircraft was written off and scrapped on-site
