= Akkajaure =

Reservoir in Norrbotten County, Sweden

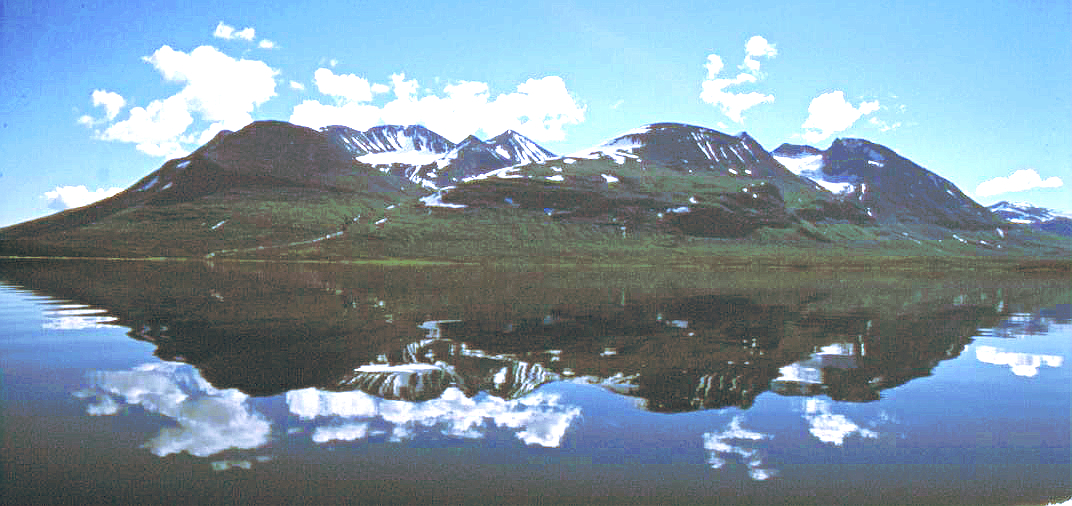
- Áhkká seen from the lake

- Location within Sweden
- Location: Norrbotten County, Lappland
- Coordinates: 67°38′07″N 17°38′29″E
- Type: man-made reservoir
- Primary inflows: 55% from Voujatätno river, 25% from nine other rivers, 20% via tunnel from Sitasjaure dam
- Primary outflows: Lule River (Luleälven), below Suorva dam
- Catchment area: 4,650 km^{2} (1,795 sq mi)
- Basin countries: Sweden
- Max. length: 60 km (37 mi)
- Max. width: 5 km (3.1 mi)
- Surface area: 266 km^{2} (103 sq mi)
- Average depth: 30 m (98 ft)
- Max. depth: 92 m (302 ft)
- Water volume: 5.9 km^{3} (1.4 cu mi)
- Surface elevation: 453 m (1,486 ft)

Akkajaure (from Lule Sami: Áhkájávrre) is one of the largest reservoirs in Sweden. It lies at the headwaters of the Lule River in Norrbotten County, in Swedish Lappland, within the Stora Sjöfallet national park. The lake formed after the construction of the first Suorva dam in 1913–1923. The rim of the current dam is at an elevation of 453 m (1,486 ft). When full, the lake's maximum depth is 92 m (302 ft), and its mean depth is about 30 m (98 ft). Because it is used for power generation, the lake depth fluctuates by up to 30 m (98 ft). On 8 January 2016, West Air Sweden Flight 294 crashed near Akkajaure, approximately 10 kilometres from the Norwegian border, killing both crew members on board.
