= History of money in Finland =

The history of money in Finland began from trading furs, primarily squirrel skins in the prehistoric times. The oldest metal coins found in Finland are Roman coins from a couple of thousand years ago. In the 5th century ancient Byzantian solidi were brought to Finland. There are plenty of coin discoveries in Finland from the Viking Age and from the crusades.

A currency named "markka" was in use around Finland already in medieval times, and its use continued until the money redefinition by Gustaf III of Sweden in the late 18th century. During the start of Russian rule in Finland until the money redefinition in 1840 Finland used the Swedish riksdaler and the Russian rouble concurrently. The Finnish markka was the official currency of Finland from 1860 to 2002. In 2002 Finland started using the euro, the common currency of the European Union.

== Fur as money ==
The Finnish word for "money", "raha", originally meant fur, mostly squirrel skin. Furs have been significant items of trade in Finland and northern Europe in the prehistoric times. The ancestors of modern Finns have had good connections in trade or exchange of gifts in many directions, and furs have played a significant part in this. Finns have often sold or donated furs to foreigners and received substances and items that had not been produced in Finland in return.

== Prehistoric metal coins ==
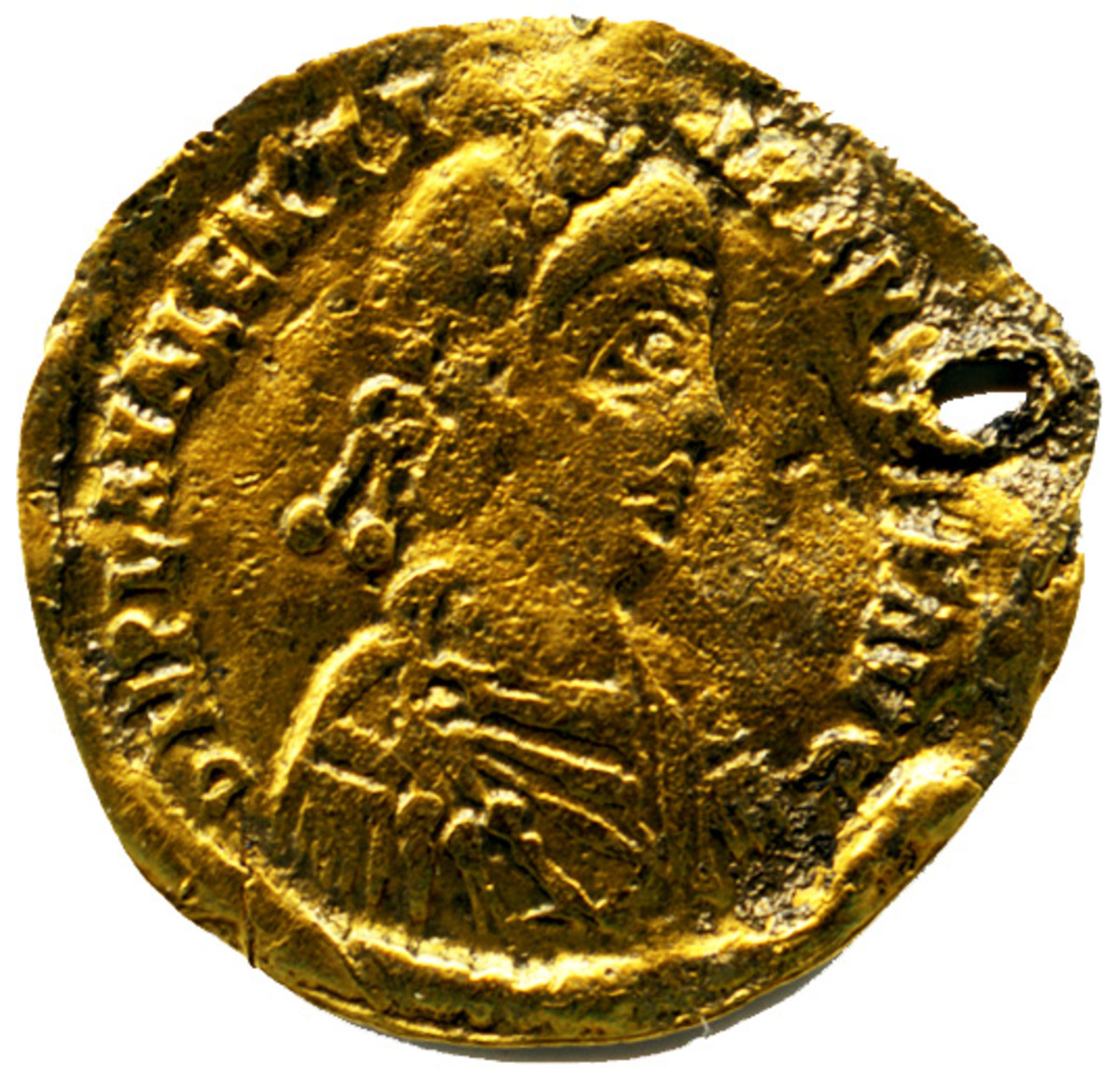
A solidus from the time of Valentinian III found in Vöyri.

The Finnish word for "coin", "kolikko" is apparently an original Finnish word. The word is onomatopoetic and describes the clinking sound of a metal coin.

The oldest metal coins found in Finland are Roman silver denarii and copper coins from the 2nd century. Some of them have apparently travelled to Finland only after the 2nd century. Two findings of Roman coins can be connected to ancient remains from the early Iron Age and they have probably come to Finland through the eastern Baltic countries.

In Ostrobothnia, there have been findings of late Roman gold coins from the 5th and 6th centuries, solidi that have come to Finland apparently through Sweden.

After solidi stopped appearing in Finland, there have been no coin findings in Finland from a period of three centuries. Around 800, a trade route was opened through the Gulf of Finland from Sweden to Russia, and there have been findings of money treasures from a place at the start of the trade route in the Åland islands, containing over 1300 Eastern silver dirham coins. There have been fewer dirham coins found in continental Finland.

In the 11th century, silver coins grew more popular in Finland Proper and Tavastia as well as later also in Karelia. Over a thousand English and over four thousand German silver coins as well as Scandinavian, Bohemian, Byzantian, Hungarian and Italian silver coins have been found from that period. The coins from the Viking Age were made of silver brought to Finland in an easily usable form which was used for trade as well as raw material for jewellery. Coins were weighted and cut and used by weight. There was no proper money economy in Finland at the time. The bringing of silver to Finland lessened in the middle 11th century and money started growing more popular in Finland again in the 13th and 14th centuries.

Copies of a sort of foreign coins, mostly Anglo-Saxon and Byzantic coins were also made in Finland. Such copies were also made at the time in Sweden, Norway and Denmark. The copies in Finland have been made with a common hammering method so that they would be easy to manufacture in large numbers. However, not very many of such copied coins have been found. The research of Pekka Sarvas in 1973 found fifteen such coins in Finnish museums, not counting the coins that had been made with some other method. The copied coins were not meant to be exact reproductions of the originals, as the value of coins in Finland was in their metal, and they had no agreement of value in far-away lands. The number of copied coins found in Finland has since doubled. In his 2014 article, Tuukka Talvio questioned the Finnish origin of copies of Byzantic coins but saw that they had probably been struck in south-western Finland. He also tells from a type of copied money recently found in Finland that had not been researched yet.

In many places, folk tradition tells of treasures hidden below the ground. They could be guarded by for example a Kratti creature lying on top of them or by a will-o'-the-wisp. Many real discoveries of money treasures have been explained that they were hidden below the ground in times of danger. Folk tradition also tells that the treasures were born in this manner. There have also been other explanations: hiding treasure might have been connected to magical beliefs or simply a lack of means to store the treasure. Items of money have also been found in graves where they had been buried along with the deceased.

== Swedish rule ==
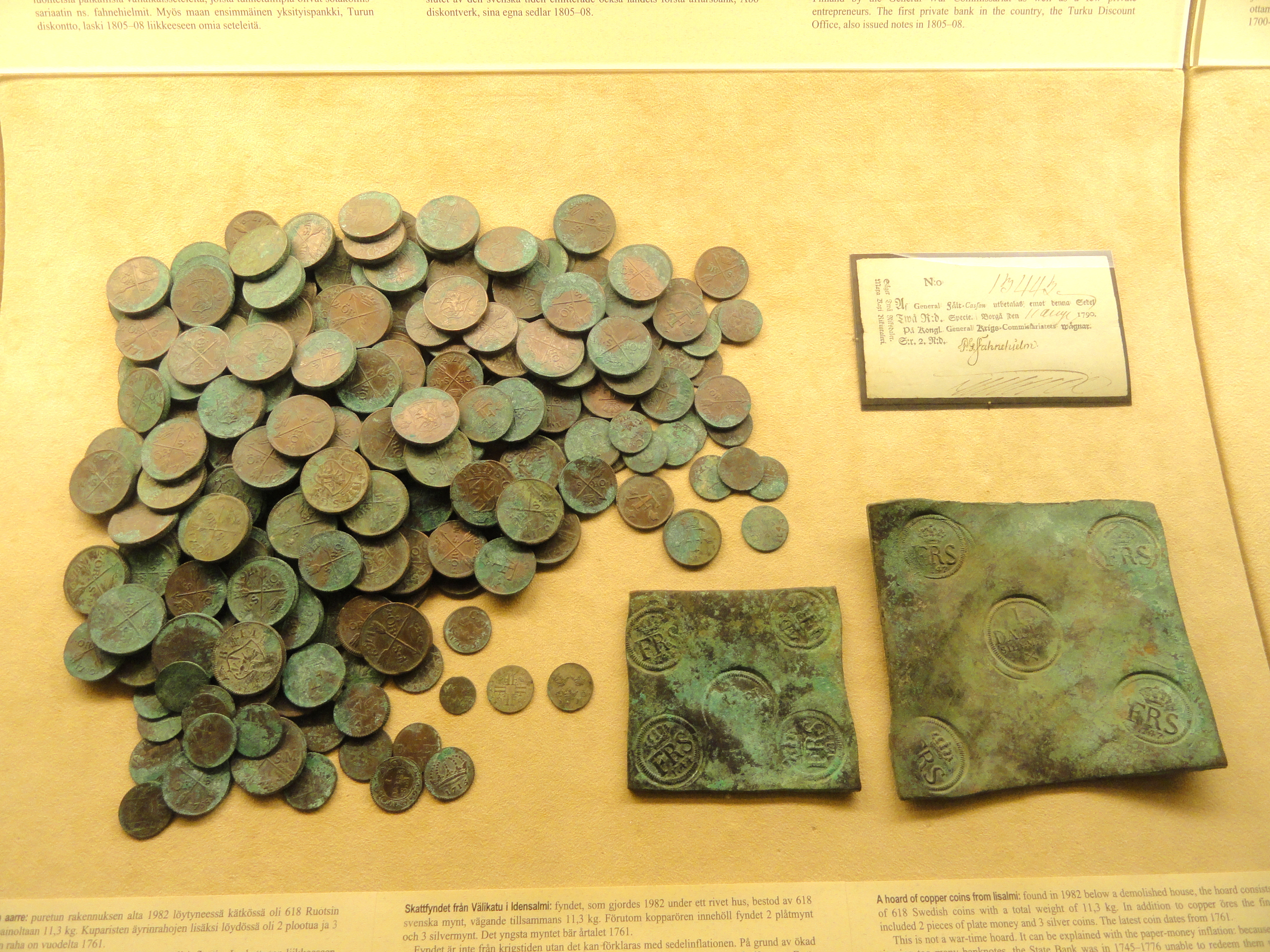
Swedish riksdaler

When Finland was annexed to Sweden, Swedish money was used in Finland. It originally grew popular in Åland in the 13th century and in continental Finland in the 14th century, but in inland Finland only in the 15th century. In southern Finland, Livonian money was used concurrently with Swedish money in medieval times. This Livonian money had usually been struck in Tallinn. Some English and German gold coins were also used. There was a mint in Turku approximately from 1410 to 1558.

The oldest unit of currency known in Finland is the kuusinainen or abo, with a value of six penninkiä (pfenning). This name was already used by Mikael Agricola in his writings, although the currency was already in use before his birth, at least since the 15th century.

The basis of Swedish money was the unit of account mark or markka, divided into eight öre or äyriä. The largest struck coin was the örtug, with an original value of a third of an öre, and of half an öre since the 1520s. Before this the only struck units of money were the pfenning (one 192th of a mark) and the ropo, with half of the value. Most of the coins struck in Turku found from before the time of Gustaf Vasa have been örtugs and half-örtugs; some pfennings were also produced. The name of the coin struck in Turku was kuusinainen in Finnish, fyrk in Swedish and abo in Latin. The Finnish name comes from its value of six penninkiä. In contrast, the Swedish name comes from the words fyra penningar meaning four pfennings, because the value of the coin had since lowered.

Large silver coins were placed in circulation in Sweden-Finland during Gustaf Vasa's time, with face values of an öre (1522), a mark (1536) and a daler (1534). Until the 1620s only silver was used as a coin metal. Copper coins started to be struck in 1624. From 1644 to 1778, large copper plates known as plåt were also used. Sweden started using paper money in 1661.

The value of money in Sweden was recalculated in 1776 in order to stop inflation. At this time, the riksdaler became the base unit of currency. During the last decades of Swedish rule in Finland, there were two times when local paper money was used. In 1790, military officials used their own temporary banknotes, and the Discount office in Turku active from 1806 to 1808 also used its own banknotes.

== Money in autonomous Finland ==
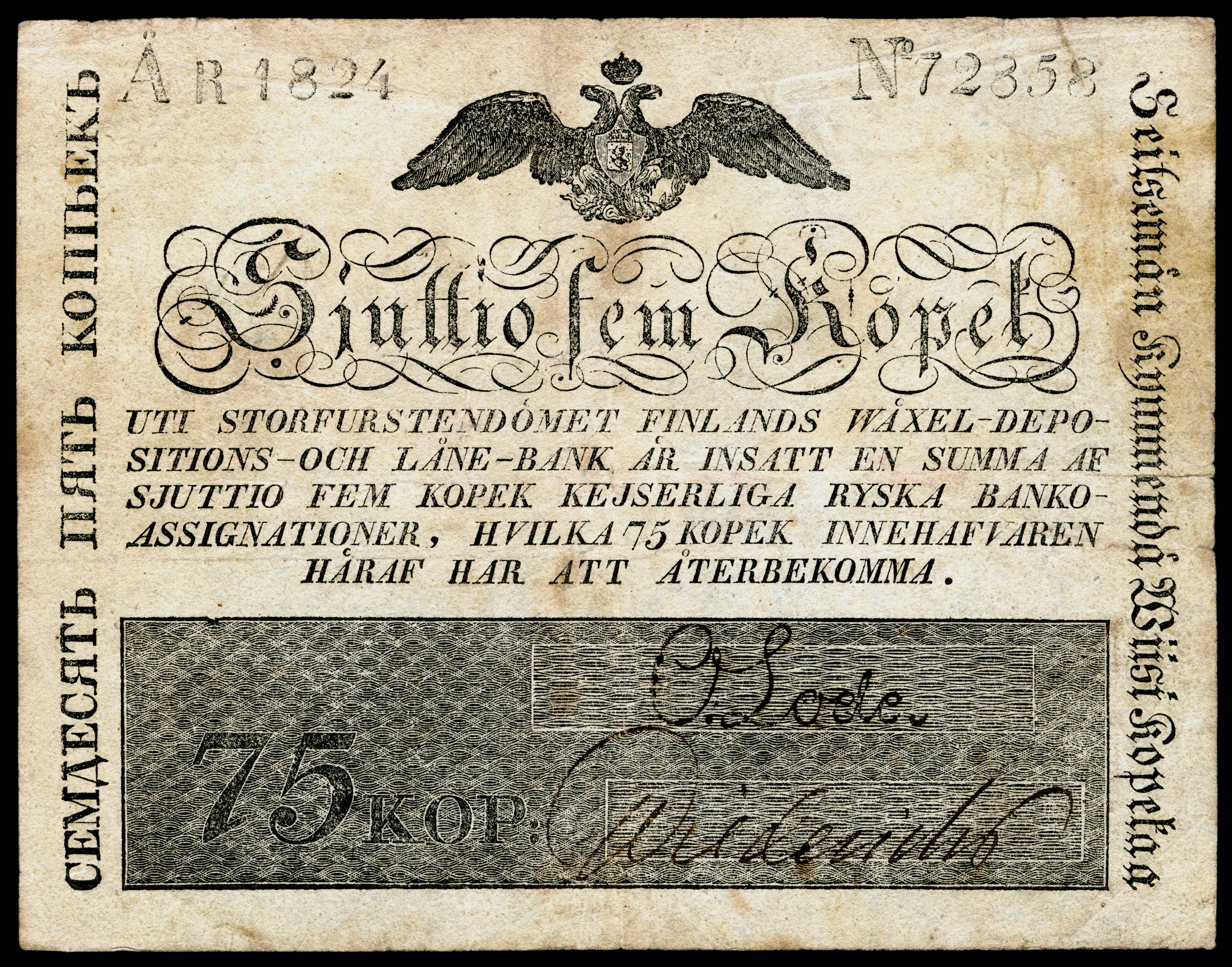
A Finnish 75 kopek banknote from 1824.

The oldest Russian coins found in Finland were found in a cache in Karelia around the year 1100. Many Russian coins from the 16th and 17th centuries have been found in Karelia and silver roubles and copper kopeks from the 18th century have been found from a wide area in eastern Finland. During the Greater Wrath and the Lesser Wrath in the early 18th century the entire country of Finland was occupied by the Russians, and Russian money was also in use. After 1743 use of Russian copper money was forbidden, but use of silver money was still allowed.

After Russia had conquered Finland, the Russian rouble became the "main and fundamental unit of sale, i.e. money" of the Grand Duchy of Finland per an announcement made on 29 December 1809. Swedish money also remained in common use despite attempts by government officials to forbid and restrict it. The institution that eventually became the Bank of Finland, founded in Turku in 1811, received the right to print banknotes, starting from small banknotes of 20, 50 and 75 kopek on August 1812. After the bank moved to Helsinki in 1819 it continued printing banknotes there. In 1819 larger banknotes of 1, 2 and 4 roubles were printed. Printing of rouble banknotes moved to Saint Petersburg in 1821 and printing kopek banknotes moved there in 1824. A new feature of the banknotes was a narrow decorative frame with a decoration at the corner. Depending on the value, this was either a star, a crown or the coat of arms of Finland with a lion. In the 1820s banknotes started featuring relief stamps, watermarks, numbering and signatures.

In 1840 there was a money redefinition in Finland to restore the "true" value of money by binding the banknotes to the value of silver once again. At the same time, the silver rouble became the main unit of money in Finland in reality, not just in principle. Swedish banknotes were exchanged for silver coins, and they disappeared from circulation in a couple of years. New banknotes backed by silver, with face values of 3, 5, 10 and 25 roubles were printed to replace the old banknotes. In contrast to the earlier banknotes, these new banknotes were two-sided and partly also coloured, and they were of high technical and artistic quality. In addition to these banknotes, silver coins were used in Finland. Through this renovation, the Bank of Finland became a true banknote bank which could function even better both domestically and internationally.

== The Finnish markka ==
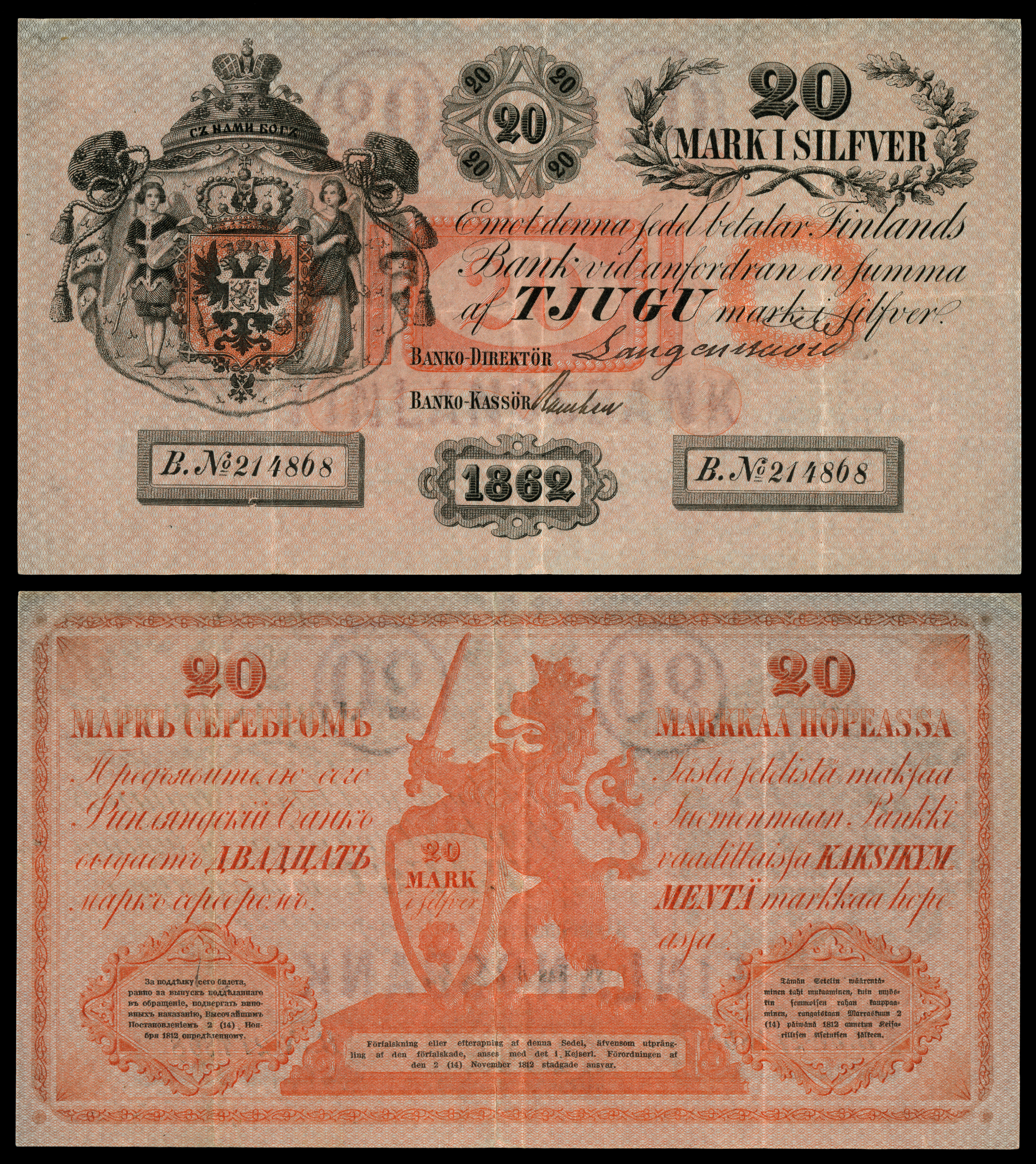
A 20 markkaa banknote from the 1863 series, both sides.

On an initiative of the chief of treasury Fabian Langenskiöld, the Senate of Finland made a proposal to the Emperor in December 1859 that Russian banknotes would no longer be used in Finland for their face value, but instead of their real price, which would be defined at the stock market in Saint Petersburg. The reason for this was instability of the Russian economy caused by the Crimean War in 1853 to 1856, which had caused the Bank of Finland to stop exchanging rouble banknotes for silver. Finland asked for permission for a currency of its own and got the permission on 4 April 1860, when Emperor Alexander II of Russia signed the Merciful Announcement of His Imperial Majesty of a new currency for the Grand Duchy of Finland.

At first the value of the markka was tied to the Russian rouble: one markka equalled one quarter of a rouble. The name for the new currency was chosen with a competition.

The markka was tied to the value of silver in 1865 - without the Russian rouble. At this time, one pound of silver had a value of 94.48 markkaa. In 1848 the markka was tied to a gold standard, where 20 markkaa had a value equal to 6.45 grams of a mixture with 900 per mille of pure gold.

From 1945 to 1947 the markka was devalued numerous times, and once again in 1957. Thus in the 1950s the markka had less than one hundredth of the value it had had before World War I. In 1962 a new money law was made, which went into force at the start of the next year. This caused a monetary reform, where one new markka equalled a hundred old markkaa and one new penni equalled one old markka.

In 1991 the markka was the European Currency Unit but was decoupled from it through another devaluation of 12 percent after only a couple of months. The markka was floated again in 1992 and joined the European Monetary System in 1996.

== Finland and the euro ==
The Finnish markka was tied to the euro, the common currency of the European Union on 1 January 1999 and thus in practice ceased being an independent currency. Euro banknotes and coins were taken into use in Finland and in many other euro countries on 1 January 2002.

== Sources ==
- Talvio, Tuukka: Suomen rahat, 3rd expanded edition. Bank of Finland 2003. ISBN 952-462-033-2.
- Talvio, Tuukka: The Viking Age in Finland: Numismatic Aspects. Fibula Fabula Fact, 2014.
- Sarvas, Pekka: Bysanttilaiset rahat ja niiden jäljitelmät Suomen 900- ja 1000-lukujen löydöissä. Publications of the Organisation for Archeological Research in Finland, 1975
- Suomen sanojen alkuperä: Etymologinen sanakirja A-K. Finnish Literature Society 1992.

== Bibliography ==
- Keskitalo, Kristian: Suomen rahan sääntelyn oikeushistoria: Raha oikeudellisena maksuvälineenä ennen ja nyt. Dissertation, University of Helsinki 2022. ISBN 978-951-51-7897-8.
