= Norwegian penning =

Old Scandinavian coin type

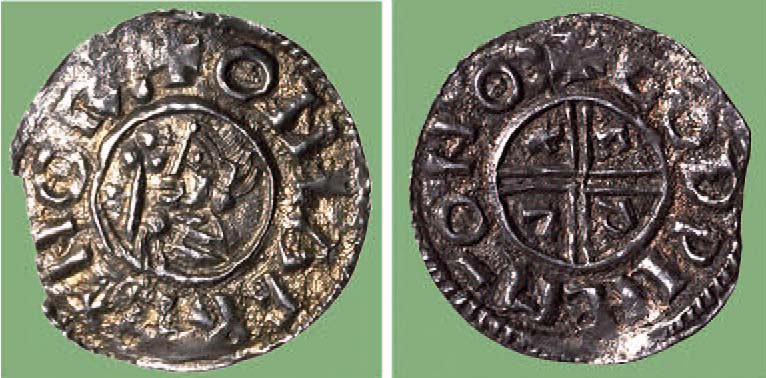
Norwegian penning minted of Olaf Tryggvason (995-1000)

The penning was the dominant currency of the Norwegian coin system in the period 995–1387.

Minted in Norway by the kings of Norway from Olaf Tryggvason (995-1000) and up to Olaf Haakonsson (1380-1387), it remained as a unit of account in the kingdom until 1513. It was introduced the year 995 in the image of the Anglo-Saxon coinage, and was the first and oldest currency of Norway. The coin system was later adapted in both Sweden and Denmark.

The name lives on in the North Germanic languages in the contracted form of the plural, penger/pengar, which means money.

In the old Norwegian weight system it entered into units as ertog, øre and mark. Penning amended standard on several occasions through the Middle Ages. Both coin image, inscriptions, size, weight, and the silver content could vary considerably.

The penning was minted in imitation of the pennies, pfennig and deniers issued elsewhere in Europe. However, although based on these coins, the accounting system was distinct, with different systems operating in different regions. All used the öre which was worth 1/8 of a mark or 3 örtugs.

Value relations between mark, øre, örtug, and penning:

- 1 mark = 8 øre = 24 örtogs = 240 pennings
- 1 øre = 3 örtogs = 30 pennings
- 1 örtog = 10 pennings

== Historical timeline of Norwegian currency ==
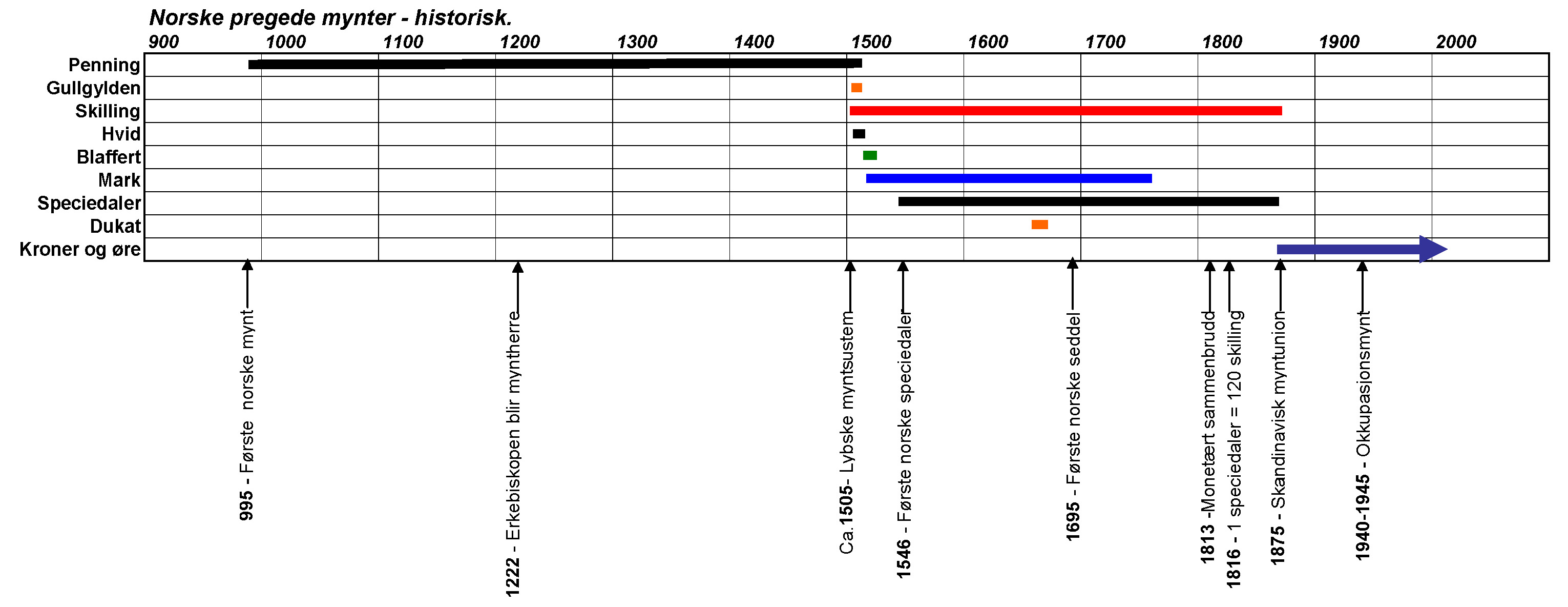
Historical embossed Norwegian coins

== See also ==
- Swedish penning, its former Swedish interpretation
- penny, its British equivalent
- denier, its former French equivalent
- pfennig, its former German equivalent
