= Finnish markka =

Currency of Finland from 1860 to 2002

Suomen markka (Finnish); finsk mark (Swedish)
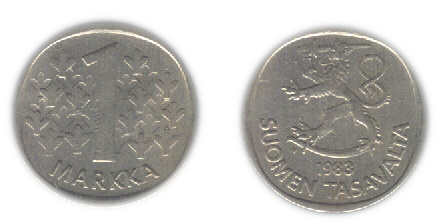
- 1 mk, 1983

ISO 4217
- Code: FIM

Units of account
- Plural: markkaa (Finnish partitive sg.) mark (Swedish)
- Symbol: mk
- Subunit
- 1/100: penni
- Plural
- penni: penniä (Finnish partitive sg.) penni (Swedish)
- Symbol
- penni: p

Denominations
- Banknotes
- Freq. used: 10 mk, 20 mk, 50 mk, 100 mk, 500 mk
- Rarely used: 1000 mk
- Coins
- Freq. used: 10p, 50p, 1 mk, 5 mk, 10 mk
- Rarely used: 1p (until 1979), 5p and 20p (until 1990)

Demographics
- Date of introduction: 1860
- Replaced: Ruble and Riksdaler
- Replaced by: Euro
- User(s): Grand Duchy of Finland (1860–1917); Republic of Finland (1917–2002)

Issuance
- Central bank: Bank of Finland
- Website: www.suomenpankki.fi/en/

Valuation
- Inflation: 1.3%
- Source: CIA World Factbook 2001

EU Exchange Rate Mechanism (ERM)
- Since: 14 October 1996
- Fixed rate since: 31 December 1998
- Replaced by euro, non cash: 1 January 1999
- Replaced by euro, cash: 1 March 2002
- 1 € =: 5.94573 mk
- This infobox shows the latest status before this currency was rendered obsolete.

The markka (Finnish: markka; Swedish: mark; sign: mk; ISO code: FIM), also known as the Finnish mark, was the currency of Finland from 1860 until 28 February 2002, when Finland adopted the euro, and it ceased to be legal tender. The markka was divided into 100 pennies (Finnish: penni; Swedish: penni), abbreviated as "p". At the point of conversion, the rate was fixed at €1 = 5.94573 mk.

The markka was replaced by the euro (€), which had been introduced, in cash form, on 1 January 2002. This was after a transitional period of three years, when the euro was the official currency but only existed as "book money" outside of the monetary base. The dual circulation period, when both the markka and the euro had legal tender status, ended on 28 February 2002.

== Etymology ==
The name markka was based on a medieval unit of weight. Both markka and penni are similar to words used in Germany for that country's former currency, based on the same etymological roots as the Deutsche Mark and pfennig.

Although the word markka predates the currency by several centuries, the currency was established before being named markka. A competition was held for its name, and some of the other entries included sataikko (meaning "having a hundred parts"), "omena" (apple) and suomo (from Suomi, the Finnish name for Finland).

The Finnish language does not use plurals when referring to multiple markkaa, but partitive singular forms: "10 markkaa" and "10 penniä" (the nominative is penni). In Swedish, the singular and plural forms of "mark" and "penni" are the same.

=== Nicknames ===
When the euro replaced the markka, mummonmarkka (lit. 'grandma's markka', sometimes shortened to just mummo) became a new colloquial term for the old currency. The sometimes used "old markka" can be misleading, since it can also be used to refer to the pre-1963 markka. In Helsinki slang, the sum of a hundred markkaa was traditionally called a huge [hu.ge] (from Swedish hundra for "hundred"). After the 1963 reform, this name was used for one new markka.

== History ==
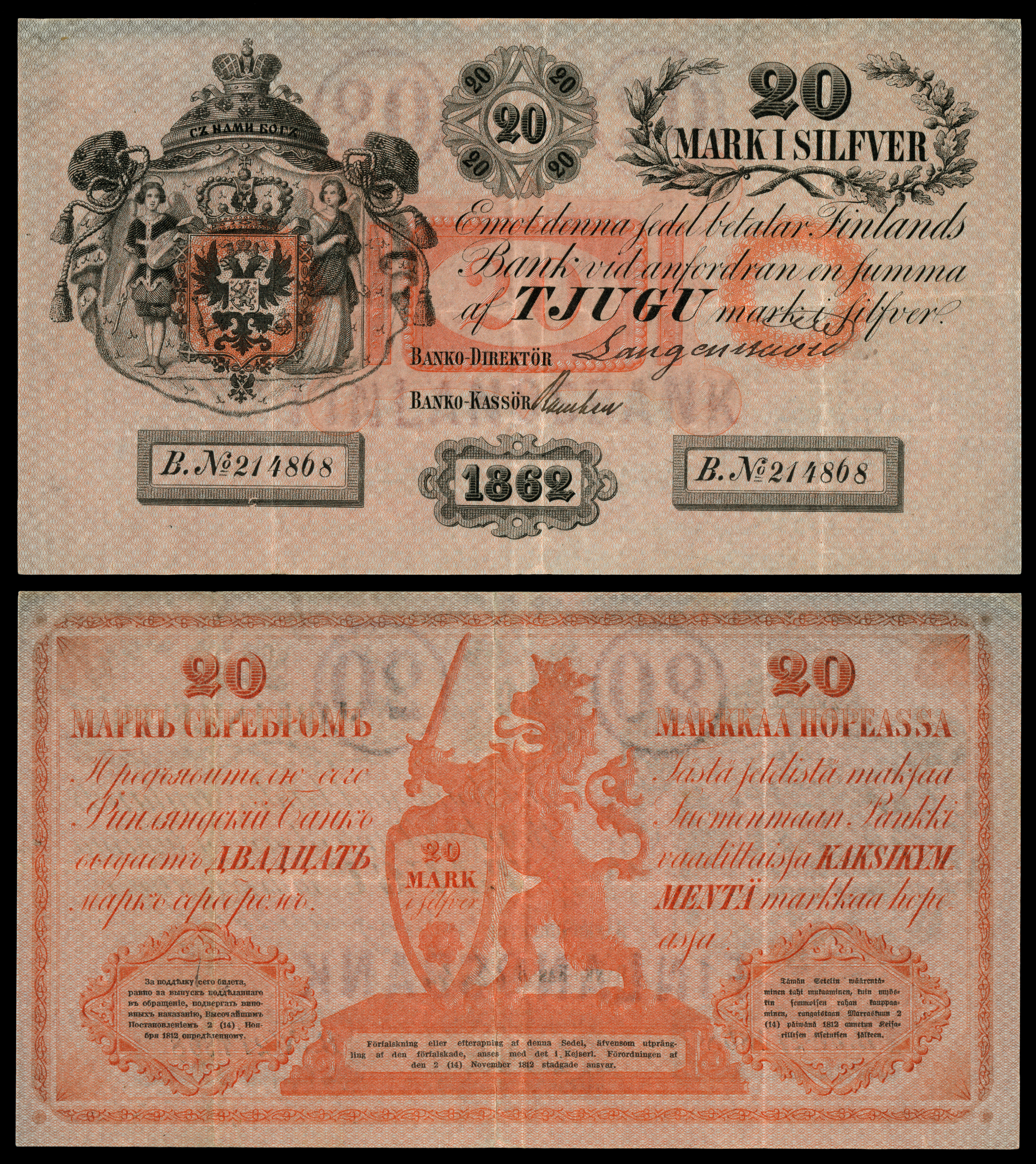
20 mk banknote issued in 1862 for the Grand Duchy of Finland. The banknote's obverse depicts the coat of arms of Finland on a Russian double-headed eagle, and was personally signed by the director and the cashier of the Bank of Finland. The text on the obverse is in Swedish, whereas the reverse is primarily in Russian and Finnish.

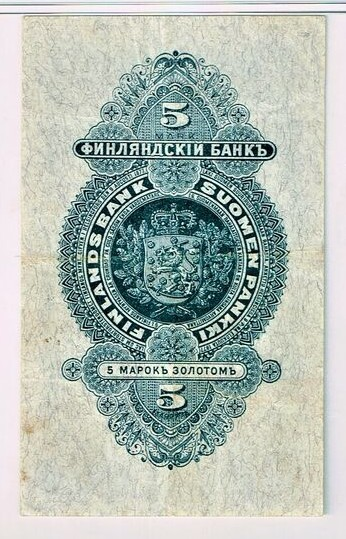
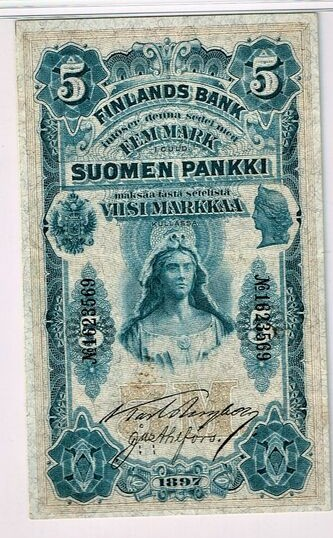
5 mk banknote of the Grand Duchy of Finland (1897)
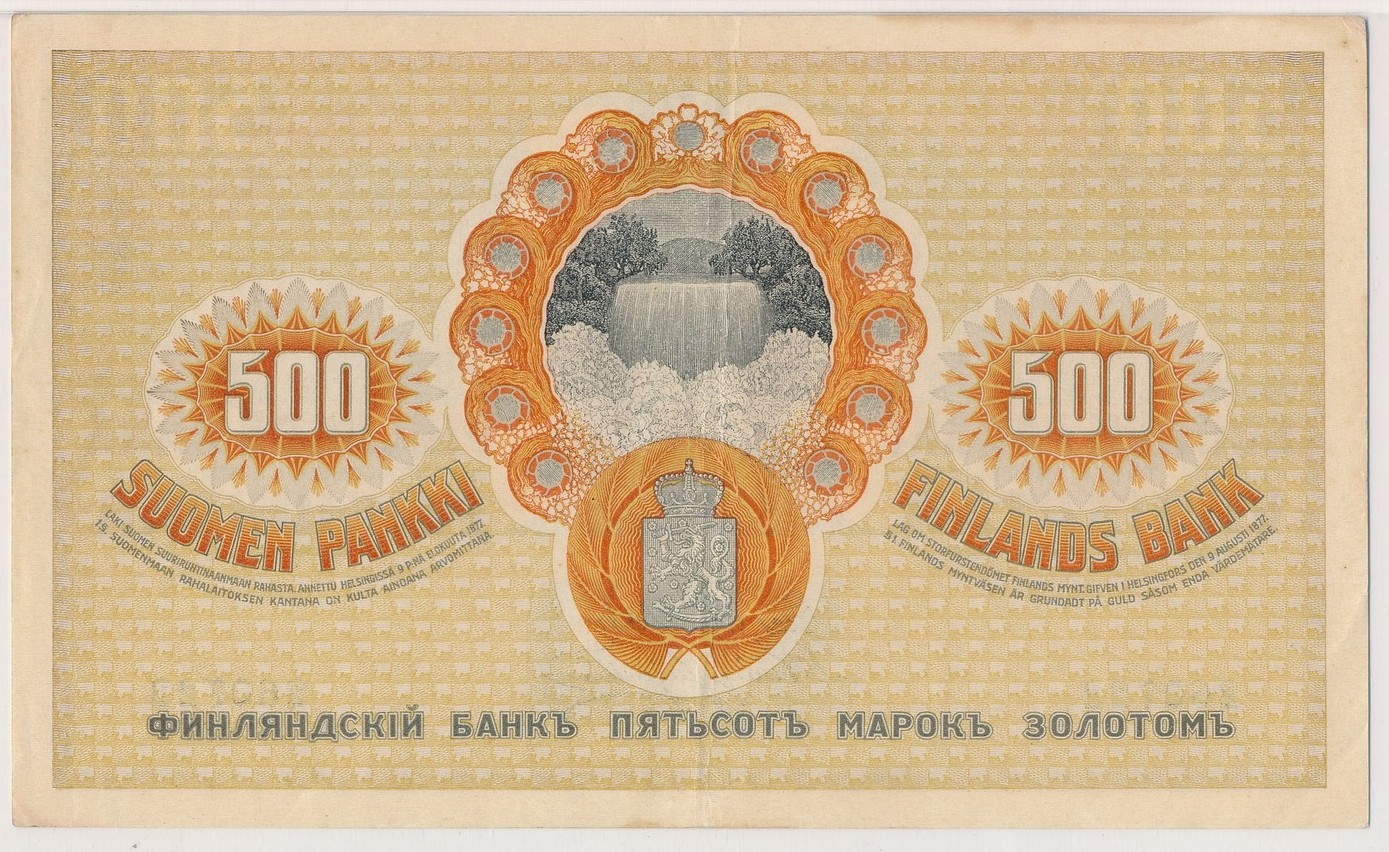
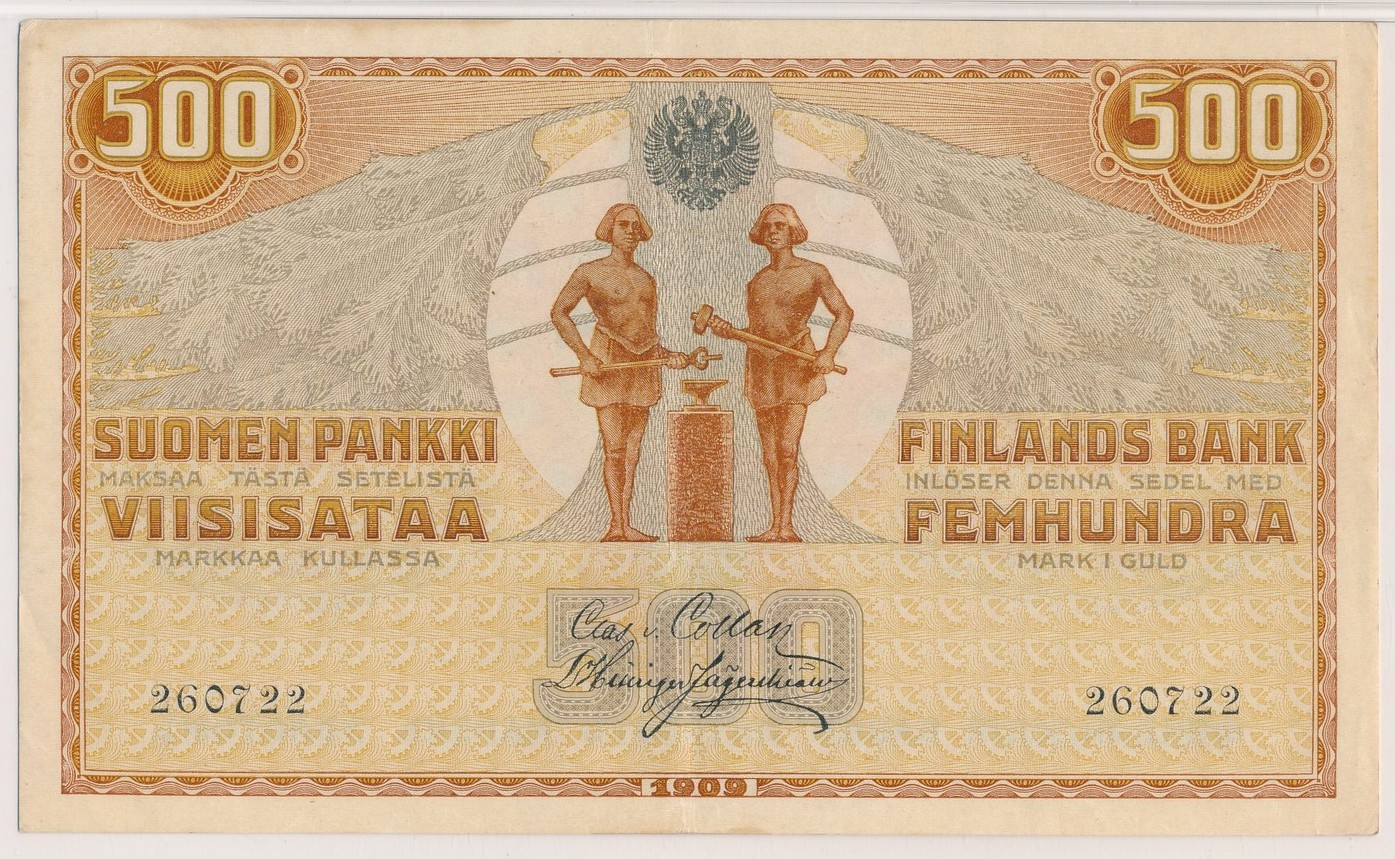
500 mk banknote of the Grand Duchy of Finland (1909)

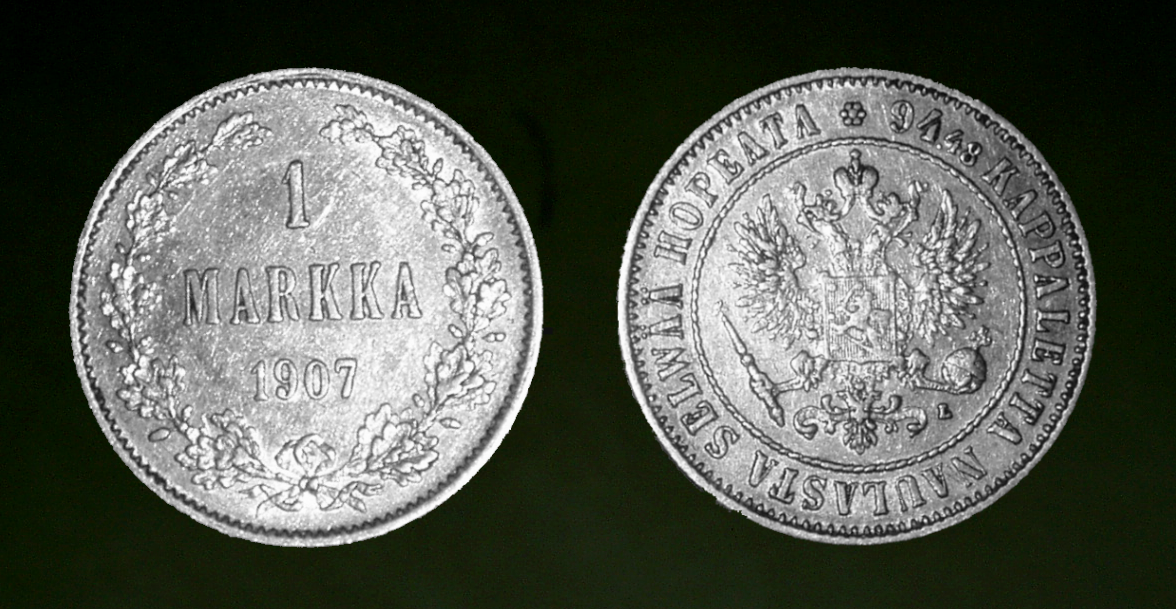
A silver markka coin used in the autonomous Grand Duchy of Finland from 1864 to 1915. The obverse of the coin (shown on the right) features the double-headed eagle of Russia, with the coat of arms featuring a lion depicted at the centre.

During its time as a grand duchy under the Russian Empire, Finland used the Russian rouble and the riksdaler of its former parent country Sweden as concurrent currencies until the currency redefinition in 1840. After this Finland used the Russian rouble as its sole currency for two decades.

The markka was introduced in 1860 by the Bank of Finland, replacing the Russian ruble at a rate of four markkaa to one ruble.

Senator Fabian Langenskiöld is called "father of the markka". In late 1859, on Langenskiöld's initiative the Senate of Finland made a proposition to the Emperor that banknotes of the Russian rouble would no longer be used for their face value in Finland, but instead for their real price, which would be defined at the stock market in St. Petersburg. The reason for this was instability caused by the Crimean War, which had caused the Bank of Finland to stop exchanging its rouble banknotes for silver. Finland asked the Emperor for permission for a currency of its own and got the permission on 4 April 1860, when Emperor Alexander II of Russia signed the Merciful announcement by his Imperial Majesty for a new currency for the Grand Duchy of Finland. The markka was taken into use in 1860, but its value was tied to the Russian rouble: one markka equalled one quarter of a rouble, but there was speculation in Russia that even that was too much of a value for the new currency.

Both Fabian Langenskiöld who acted as the head of the finance office of the Senate of Finland from 1858 to 1863 and his successor Johan Vilhelm Snellman have been called "the father of the markka". The markka was taken into use in Langenskiöld's time, but its separation from the Russian rouble fell to Snellman. In 1862 Langenskiöld had received acceptance from the Emperor for his plan to have the markka coins as Finland's only legal tender and give the Bank of Finland the right to accept its banknotes for their face value. The implementation of this plan fell to Snellman after Langenskiöld's death in summer 1863.

A loan was necessary for the birth of the markka, as accepting banknotes would only be possible if there was enough silver in the vault of the Bank of Finland. This loan was received from the powerful banker Carl Mayer von Rotschild. This was Finland's first loan from the western finance market.

In 1865, the markka was separated from the ruble and tied to the value of silver, becoming an independent currency. From 1878 to 1915, Finland adopted the gold standard of the Latin Monetary Union.

In 1878 the markka was tied to a gold standard, and 20 markkaa corresponded to 6.45 grams of a mixture containing 900 per mille of pure gold. The markka was of equal value with the French franc, the Belgian franc, the Swiss franc and the Italian lira (and later also with other member states of the so-called Latin Monetary Union). The size, weight and gold content of these coins was equal regardless of the issuing country and in theory, they were also legal tender regardless of the issuing country, even though gold 10 and 20 markkaa coins were struck in so small amounts compared to the other corresponding European coins that no significant numbers of these coins ever wound up in central Europe.

Before World War I the legal tender in Finland was gold markka coins, of which quite few were actually in circulation. On the other hand, banknotes issued by the Bank of Finland were not legal tender. This meant that a creditor had to accept Finnish gold coins as payment, but was under no obligation to accept banknotes, even though these could be exchanged for gold coins. In practice however everyone also accepted payment in banknotes.

Up until World War I, the value of the markka fluctuated within +23%/−16% of its initial value, but with no trend. The markka suffered heavy inflation (91%) during 1914–18. Gaining independence in 1917, Finland returned to the gold standard from 1926 to 1931. While prices remained stable until 1940, the markka suffered heavy inflation (17% annually on average) during World War II and again in 1956–57 (11%). In 1963, in order to reset the inflation, the markka was redenominated and replaced by a new markka worth 100 old markkaa.

Finland joined the Bretton Woods Agreement in 1948. The value of the markka was pegged to the dollar at 320 mk = US$1, which became New 3.20 mk = US$1 in 1963 and devalued to 4.20 mk = US$1 in 1967. After the breakdown of the Bretton Woods agreement in 1971, a basket of currencies became the new reference. Inflation was high (over 5%) during 1971–85. Occasionally, devaluation was used, 60% in total between 1975 and 1990, allowing the currency to more closely follow the depreciating US dollar than the rising German mark. The paper industry, which mainly traded in US dollars, was often blamed for demanding these devaluations to boost their exports. Various economic controls were removed and the market was gradually liberalized throughout the 1980s and the 1990s.

The monetary policy called "strong markka policy" (vahvan markan politiikka) was a characteristic feature of the 1980s and early 1990s. The main architect of this policy was President Mauno Koivisto, who opposed floating the currency and devaluations. As a result, the nominal value of the markka was extremely high, and in the year 1990, Finland was nominally the most expensive country in the world according to OECD's Purchasing Power Parities report.

Koivisto's policy was maintained only briefly after Esko Aho was elected Prime Minister. In 1991, the markka was pegged to the currency basket ECU, but the peg had to be withdrawn after two months with a devaluation of 12%. In 1992, Finland was hit by a severe recession, the early 1990s depression in Finland. It was caused by several factors, the most severe being the incurring of debt, as the 1980s economic boom was based on debt. Also, the Soviet Union had collapsed, which brought an end to bilateral trade, and existing trade connections were severed. The most important source of export revenue, Western markets, were also depressed during the same time, in part due to the war in Kuwait. As a result, by some opinions years overdue, the artificial fixed exchange rate was abandoned and the markka was floated. Its value immediately decreased 13% and the inflated nominal prices converged towards German levels. In total, the value of the markka had decreased 40% as a result of the recession. Also, as a result, several entrepreneurs who had borrowed money denominated in foreign currency suddenly faced insurmountable debt.

Inflation was low during the markka's independent existence as a floating currency (1992–1999): 1.3% annually on average. The markka was added into the ERM system in 1996 and then became a fraction of the euro in 1999, with physical euro money arriving later in 2002. It has been speculated that if Finland had not joined the euro, market fluctuations such as the dot-com bubble would have reflected as wild fluctuations in the price of the markka. Nokia, formerly traded in markka, was in 2000 the European company with the highest market capitalization.

== Coins ==
=== First markka ===
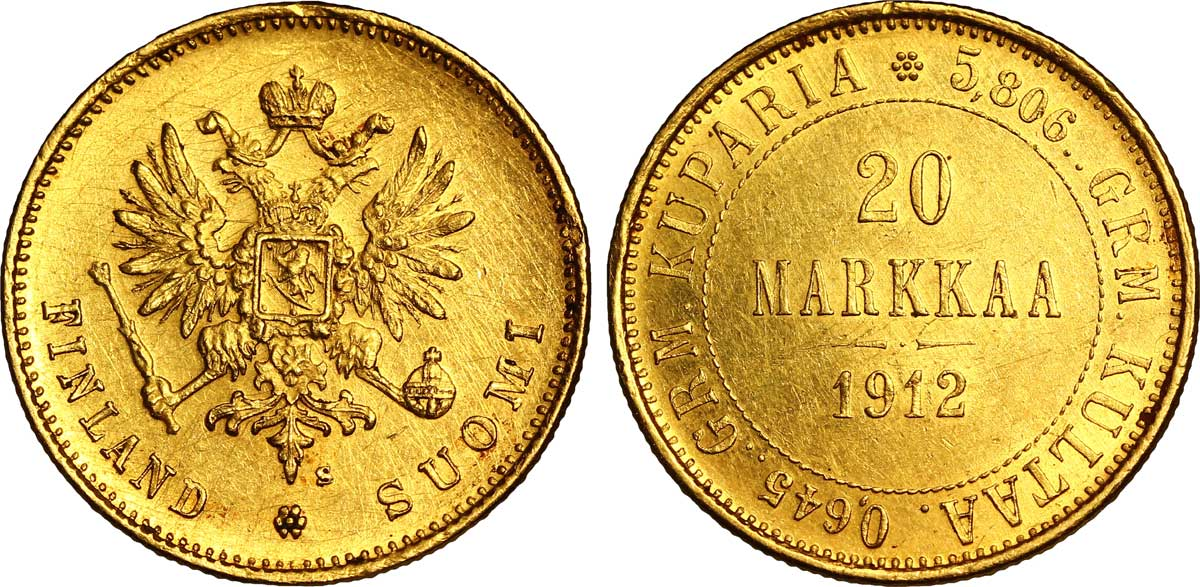
A 20 mk coin from 1912

When the markka was introduced, coins were minted in copper (1, 5 and 10 penniä), silver (25p and 50p, 1 mk and 2 mk) and gold (10 mk and 20 mk). The first markka coins were designed by the Russian artist Alexander Fadeyev. The first coin stamps for the markka coins were carved by the carver of the Mint of Finland Lea Ahlborn in 1863. The Mint of Finland started operating right after its premises were completed in Katajanokka, Helsinki in autumn 1864, and the first silver markka coins were struck on 15 October 1864.

When the markka was tied to silver in 1865, markka coins were struck for "94.48 pieces for a pound of clear silver", meaning that a pound of silver gave 94.48 markka coins. "Full-value" coins of 1 and 2 markkaa were struck from a mixture containing 868 per mille of silver. The mixture used for penni coins contained 750 per mille of silver.

When the markka was tied to gold in 1877, coins of 10 and 20 markkaa were struck in gold. They were made from a mixture containing 90% of gold and 10% of copper. The gold 20 markkaa coin (6.45 g) contained 5 and 25/31 grams of pure gold, the rest was copper. The 10 markkaa coin contained gold of half of this amount, i.e. 2 and 28/31 grams of pure gold.

After the First World War, silver and gold issues were ceased and cupro-nickel 25p and 50p and 1 mk coins were introduced in 1921, followed by aluminium-bronze 5 mk, 10 mk and 20 mk between 1928 and 1931. During the Second World War, copper replaced cupro-nickel in the 25p and 50p and 1 mk, followed by an issue of iron 10p, 25p and 50p and 1 mk. This period also saw the issue of holed 5p and 10p coins.

Markka coins 1918–52
Denomination	Years	Image		Material	Size	Obverse	Reverse	Designer
1 p	1919–24			Copper	14 mm	Rampant lion and date	Denomination flanked by heraldic roses	Isak Sundell
5 p	1918–40			Copper	18 mm	Rampant lion and date	Denomination flanked by heraldic roses	Isak Sundell
5 p	1941–43			Copper	16 mm	Heraldic rose, spruce wreath, central hole and date	Denomination, two heraldic roses and a central hole	Isak Sundell
10 p	1919–40			Copper	22 mm	Rampant lion and date	Denomination surrounded by heraldic roses	Isak Sundell
10 p	1941–43			Copper	18.5 mm	Heraldic rose, spruce wreath, central hole and date	Denomination, two heraldic roses and a central hole	Isak Sundell
10 p	1943–45			Iron	16 mm	Heraldic rose, spruce wreath, central hole and date	Denomination, two heraldic roses and a central hole	Isak Sundell
25 p	1921–40			Cupro-nickel	16 mm	Rampant lion and date	Denomination flanked by rye spikes	Isak Sundell
25 p	1940–43			Copper	16 mm	Rampant lion and date	Denomination flanked by rye spikes	Isak Sundell
25 p	1943–45			Iron	16 mm	Rampant lion and date	Denomination flanked by rye spikes	Isak Sundell
50 p	1921–40			Cupro-nickel	18.5 mm	Rampant lion and date	Denomination flanked by rye spikes	Isak Sundell
50 p	1940–43			Copper	18.5 mm	Rampant lion and date	Denomination flanked by rye spikes	Isak Sundell
50 p	1943–48			Iron	18.5 mm	Rampant lion and date	Denomination flanked by rye spikes	Isak Sundell
1 mk	1921–24	1 mk obverse	1 mk reverse	Cupro-nickel	24 mm	Rampant lion and date	Denomination flanked by conifer branches	Isak Sundell
1 mk	1928–40			Cupro-nickel	21 mm	Rampant lion and date	Denomination flanked by conifer branches	Isak Sundell
1 mk	1940–51			Copper	21 mm	Rampant lion and date	Denomination flanked by conifer branches	Isak Sundell
1 mk	1943–44			Iron	21 mm	Rampant lion and date	Denomination flanked by conifer branches	Isak Sundell
5 mk	1928–46	5 mk obverse	5 mk reverse	Aluminium bronze	23 mm	Coat of arms of Finland within conifer wreath and date	Inscription Suomen tasavalta, conifer wreath and denomination	Isak Sundell
5 mk	1946–52			Brass	23 mm	Coat of arms of Finland within conifer wreath and date	Inscription Suomen tasavalta, conifer wreath and denomination	Isak Sundell
10 mk	1928–39	10 mk obverse	10 mk reverse	Aluminium bronze	27 mm	Coat of arms of Finland within conifer wreath and date	Inscription Suomen tasavalta, conifer wreath and denomination	Isak Sundell
20 mk	1931–39	20 mk obverse	20 mk reverse	Aluminium bronze	31 mm	Coat of arms of Finland within conifer wreath and date	Inscription Suomen tasavalta, conifer wreath and denomination	Isak Sundell
100 mk	1926			Gold 900	18.5 mm	Inscription Suomi Finland, rampant lion and date	Denomination flanked by spruce branches	Isak Sundell
200 mk	1926			Gold 900	22.5 mm	Inscription Suomi Finland, rampant lion and date	Denomination flanked by spruce branches	Isak Sundell

All coins below 1 markka had ceased to be produced by 1948. In 1952, a new coinage was introduced, with smaller iron (later nickel-plated) 1 mk and 5 mk coins alongside aluminium-bronze 10 mk, 20 mk and 50 mk coins and (from 1956) silver 100 mk and 200 mk denominations. This coinage continued to be issued until the introduction of the new markka in 1963.

=== Second markka ===
The old coins and banknotes were exchanged to new ones at 100:1 rate.

==== First series ====
The new markka coinage consisted initially of six denominations: 1 (bronze, later aluminium), 5 (bronze, later aluminium), 10 (aluminium-bronze, later aluminium), 20 and 50 penniä (aluminium-bronze) and 1 markka (silver, later cupro-nickel). The design of new coins (1963) was identical to those of the last issue of the old markka but with new denominations (i.e. 1 penni instead of 1 markka, etc.).

From 1972, aluminium-bronze 5 mk were also issued.

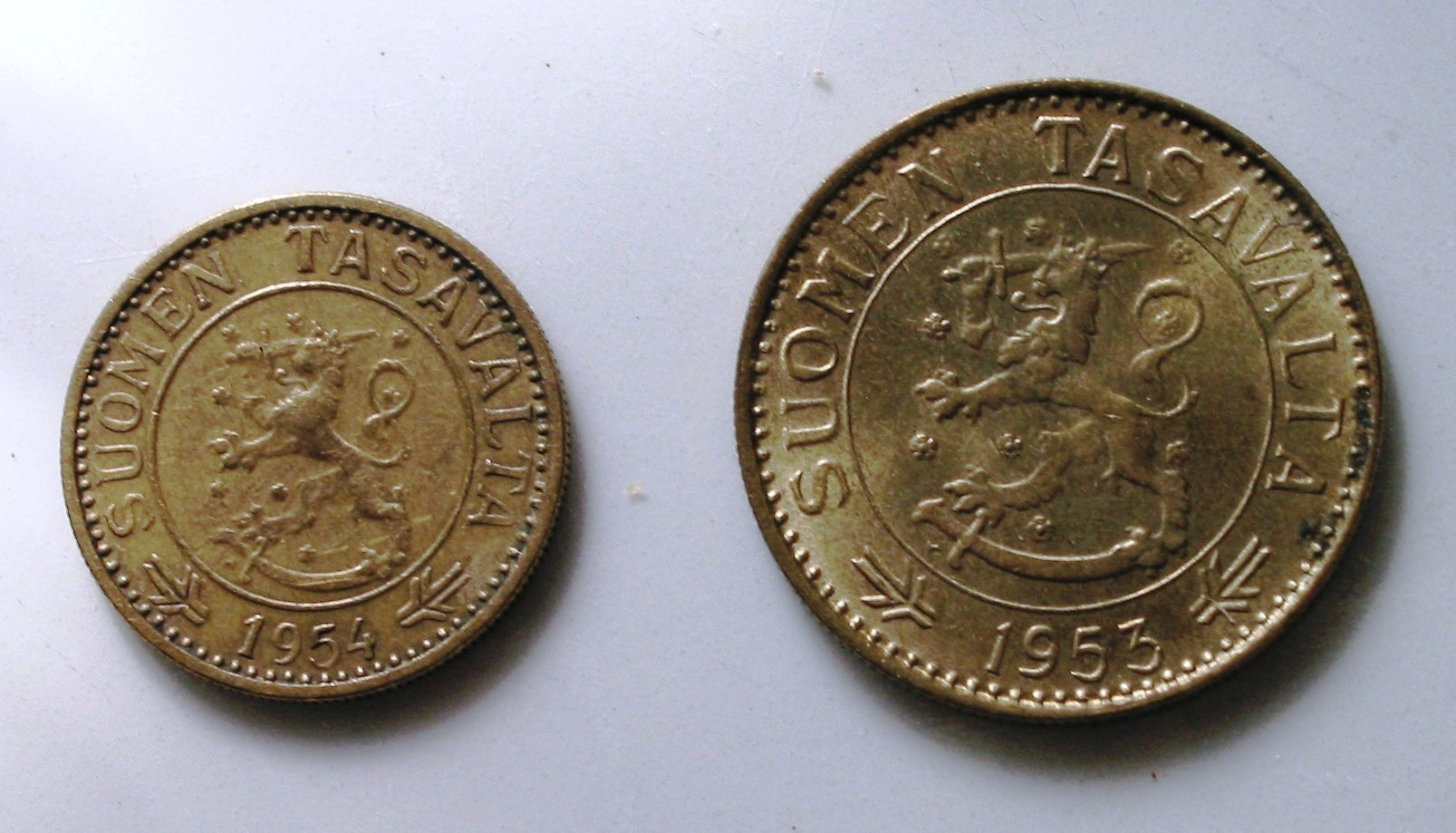
10 mark (1954) & 50 mk (1953)

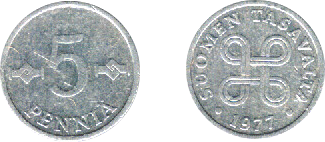
5 p Looped square (1977)

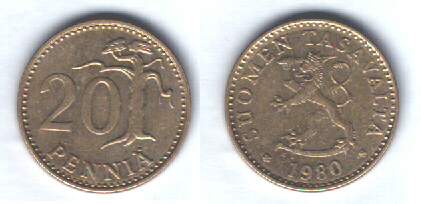
20 p (1980)

==== Second series ====
The last series of Finnish markka coins included five coins (listed with final euro values, rounded to the nearest cent):

- 10p (cupronickel) – a honeycomb on the reverse and a lily of the valley flower on the obverse = €0.02
- 50p (cupronickel) – haircap moss on the reverse and a bear on the obverse = €0.08
- 1 mk (aluminum-bronze) – the value with two traditional Finnish patterns on the reverse and the Finnish coat of arms on the obverse = €0.17
- 5 mk (aluminum-bronze) – a lily pad leaf and a dragonfly on the reverse and a Saimaa seal on the obverse = €0.84
- 10 mk (bimetallic coin, aluminum-bronze centre and cupronickel ring) – rowan tree branches and berries on the reverse and a wood grouse on the obverse = €1.68

Second series (1990–1993)
Image	Value	Technical parameters			Description			Issued from	Lapse
Image	Value	Diameter (mm)	Mass (g)	Composition	Edge	Obverse	Reverse	Issued from	Lapse
	10 p	16.30	1.80	Cupronickel: Cu: 75% Ni: 25%	Smooth	Honeycomb; value	Lily of the valley; year of issue; Lettering: Suomi Finland	1990–2001	2012
	50 p	19.70	3.30	Cupronickel: Cu: 75% Ni: 25%	Reeded	Moss; value	Brown bear; year of issue; Lettering: Suomi Finland	1990–2001	2012
	1 mk	22.25	5.00	Copper: 81% Zinc: 10% Nickel: 9%	Smooth	Ornamentation; value	Coat of arms; year of issue; Lettering: Suomi Finland	1993–2001	2012
	5 mk	24.50	5.50	Copper: 81% Zinc: 10% Nickel: 9%	Lettering: SUOMI FINLAND * SUOMI FINLAND *	White waterlily; value	Saimaa ringed seal; year of issue; Lettering: Suomi Finland	1992–2001	2012
	10 mk	27.25	8.80	Outer: Cupronickel: Cu: 75%; Ni: 25%	Smooth	Rowan; value	Capercaillie; year of issue; Lettering: Suomi Finland	1993–2001	2012
	10 mk	27.25	8.80	Inner: Aluminium bronze: Cu: 92%; Al: 6%; Ni: 2%	Smooth	Rowan; value	Capercaillie; year of issue; Lettering: Suomi Finland	1993–2001	2012
For table standards, see the coin specification table.

== Banknotes ==
This section covers the last design series of the Finnish markka, designed in the 1980s by Torsten Ekström and Finnish designer Erik Bruun and issued in 1986.

Last series (1986–1993) Designers: Torsten Ekström (obverse) and Erik Bruun (reverse)
Image		Value	Euro equi.	Dimensions (mm)	Main colour	Description		Issued from	First issued	Lapse
Obverse	Reverse	Value	Euro equi.	Dimensions (mm)	Main colour	Obverse	Reverse	Issued from	First issued	Lapse
		10 mk	€1.68	142 × 69	Blue	Paavo Nurmi	Helsinki Olympic; Stadium	1986–1991	1987	2012
		20 mk	€3.36	142 × 69	Blue yellow	Väinö Linna	Tammerkoski	1993–1996	1993	2012
		20 mk	€3.36	142 × 69	Blue yellow	Väinö Linna	Tammerkoski	1996–1999	1997	2012
		50 mk	€8.41	142 × 69	Brown	Alvar Aalto	Finlandia Hall	1985–1990	1986	2012
		50 mk	€8.41	142 × 69	Brown	Alvar Aalto	Finlandia Hall	1991–1999	1991	2012
		100 mk	€16.82	142 × 69	Green	Jean Sibelius	Whooper swans	1985–1990	1986	2012
		100 mk	€16.82	142 × 69	Green	Jean Sibelius	Whooper swans	1991–1998	1991	2012
		500 mk	€84.09	142 × 69	Red	Elias Lönnrot	Forest hiking trail	1987		2012
		500 mk	€84.09	142 × 69	Red	Elias Lönnrot	Forest hiking trail	1991–1993	1991	2012
		1000 mk	€168.19	142 × 69	Turquoise	Anders Chydenius	Kuninkaanportti	1986		2012
		1000 mk	€168.19	142 × 69	Turquoise	Anders Chydenius	Kuninkaanportti	1991–1993	1991	2012
		5000 mk	€840.94	142 × 69	Pink	Mikael Agricola	Turku Cathedral	Not introduced (Note: Note intended to be introduced only as an inflationary backup.)		
For table standards, see the banknote specification table.

In this final banknote series, the Bank of Finland used a photograph of Väinö Linna on the 20 mk note without permission from copyright holders. This was only revealed after several million notes were in use. The Bank paid 100,000 mk (€17,000) compensation to the rights holders.

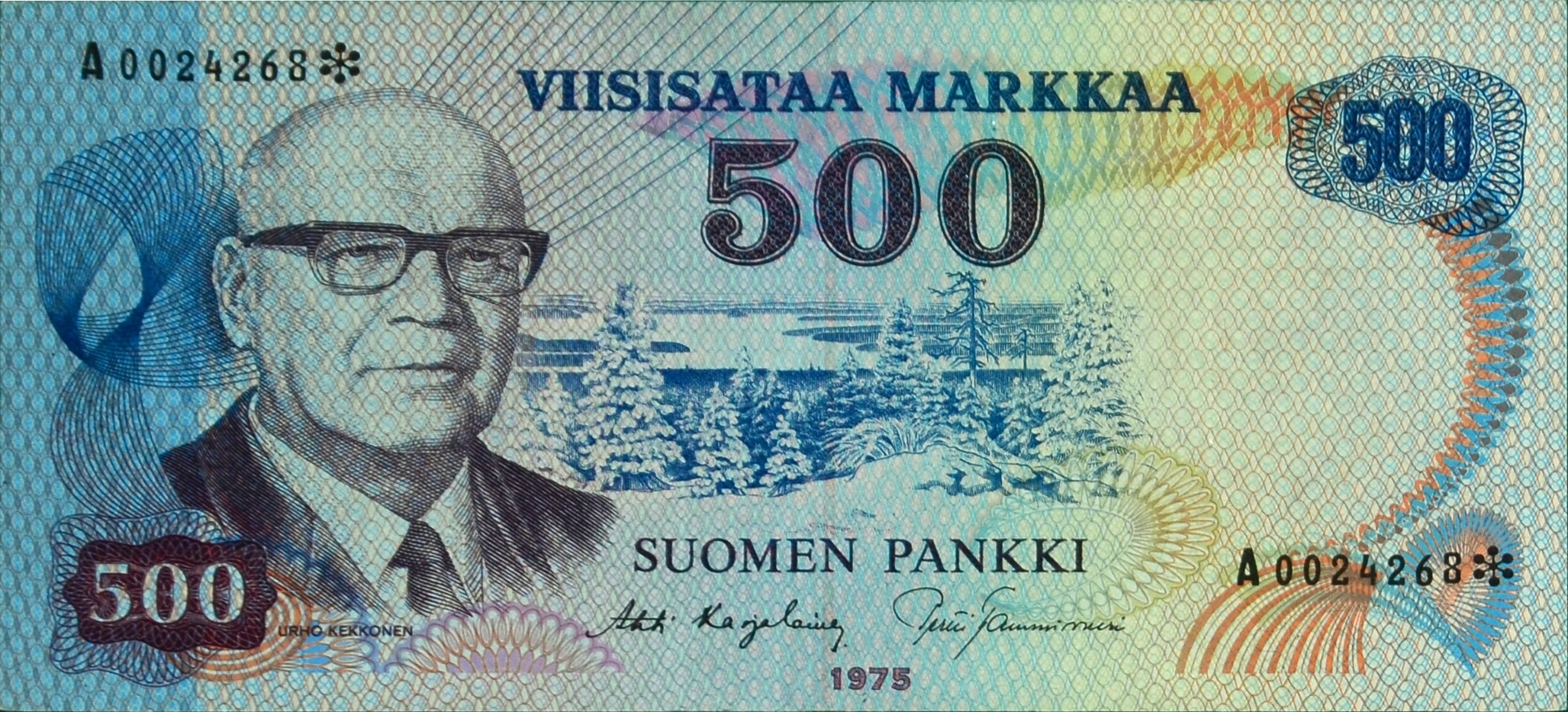
Urho Kekkonen on the 500 mk note from 1975

The second-to-last banknote design series, designed by Tapio Wirkkala, was introduced in 1955 and revised in the reform of 1963. It was the first series to depict actual specific persons rather than allegorical figures. These included Juho Kusti Paasikivi on the 10 mk, K. J. Ståhlberg on the 50 mk, J. V. Snellman on the 100 mk and, controversially, Urho Kekkonen on the 500 mk, added in 1975 to commemorate the president's 75th birthday. Unlike Erik Bruun's series, this series did not depict any other real-life subjects, but only abstract ornaments in addition to the depictions of people. A popular joke at the time was to cover Paasikivi's face except for his ear and back of the head on the 10 mk note, ending up with something resembling a mouse, said to be the only animal illustration in the entire series.

The still-older notes, designed by Eliel Saarinen, were introduced in 1922. They also depicted people, but these were generic men and women, and did not represent any specific individuals. The fact that these men and women were depicted nude caused a minor controversy at the time.

== Finnish Markka commemorative coins (collectors' coins) ==
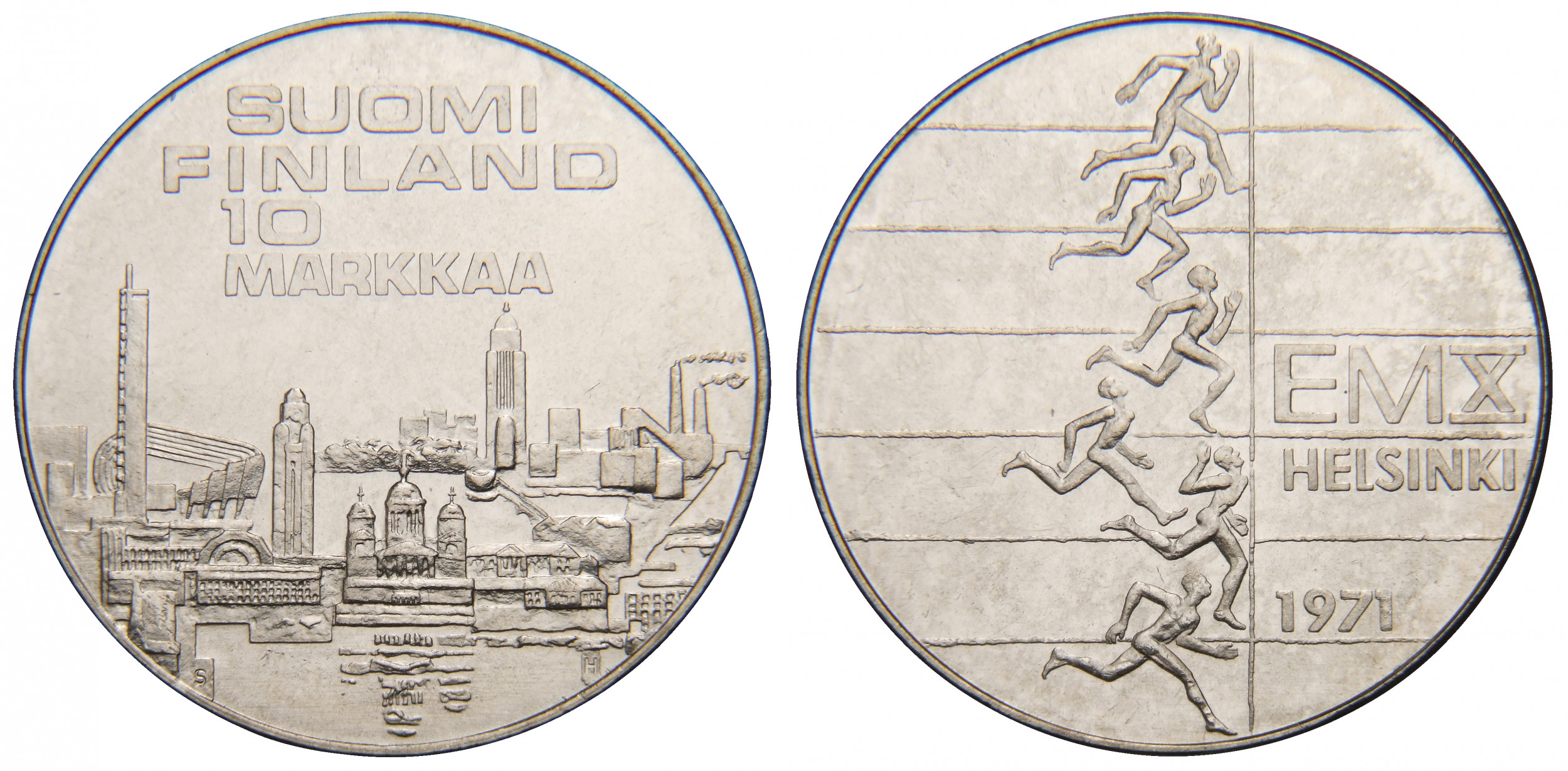
10mk X European Athletics Championships (1971)

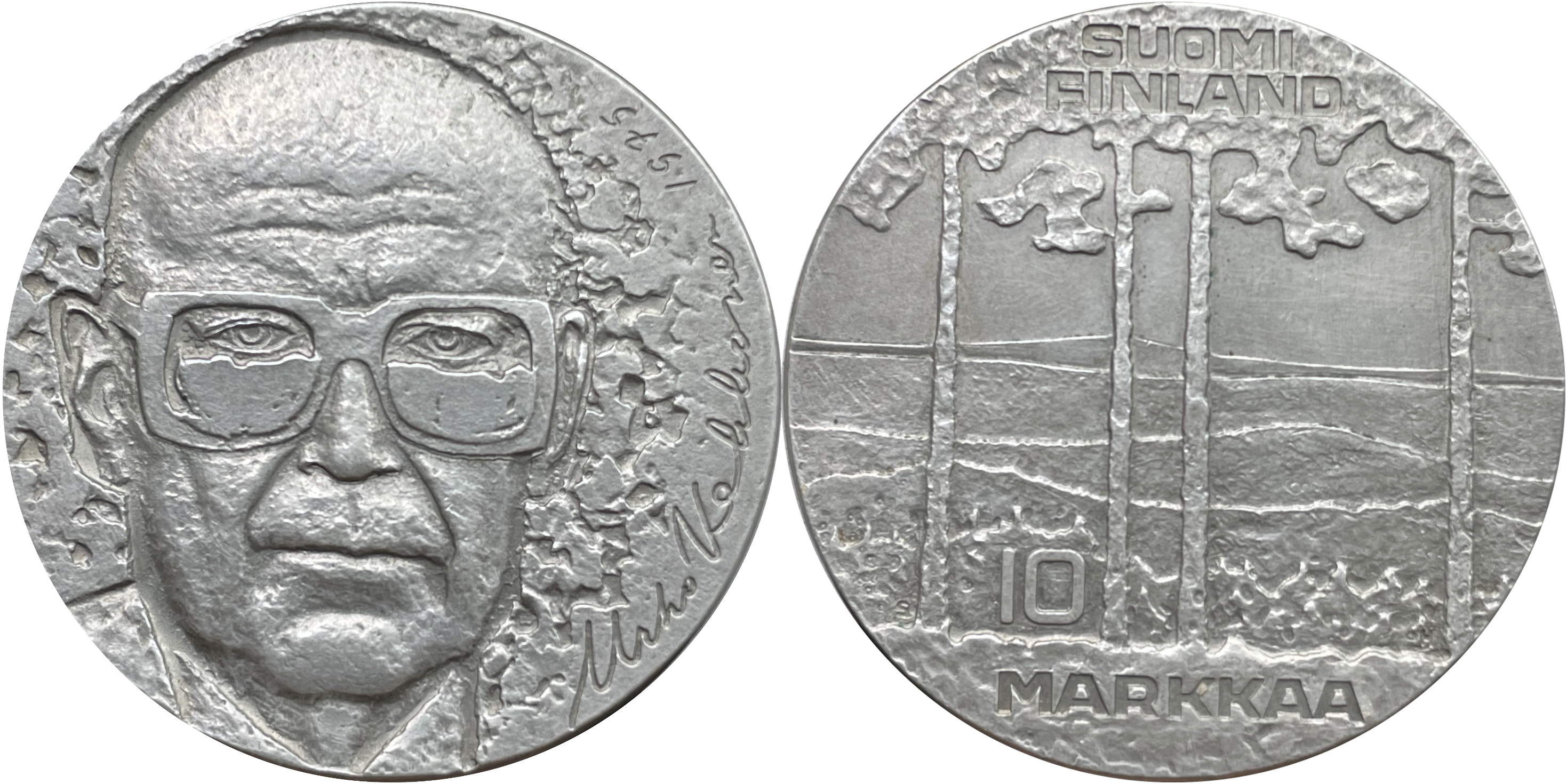
10mk President Urho Kekkonen (1975)

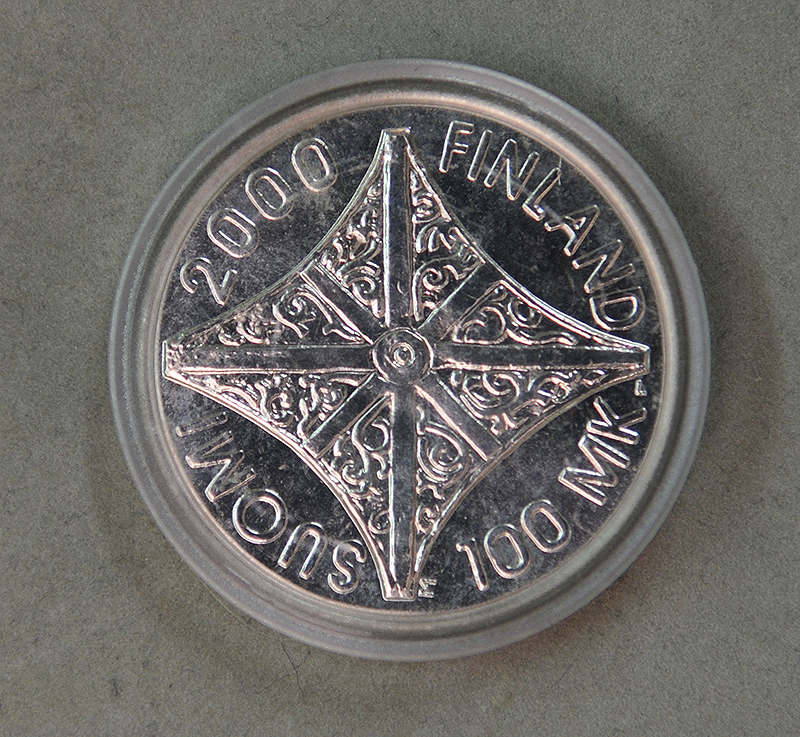
100mk Joy of the year (2000)

== Euro banknotes ==
By the end of 2001, Finland was a relatively cashless society. Most transactions were paid either using the 100 mk banknote or by debit card. There were 4 million banknotes apiece of the 500 mk and 1,000 mk denomination banknotes for a country with a population of over 5 million people. There were about 19 banknotes per individual of the smaller denomination, adding up to €241 per inhabitant. For the introduction of the euro, ECB produced €8,020 million in banknotes before the changeover.

During the first weeks of 2002, Finland's replacement of previous national banknotes with euro banknotes was among the fastest in the euro area. Of the cash payments, three-fourths were paid in euro already at the end of the first changeover week. Coins and banknotes that were legal tender at the time of the markka's retirement could be exchanged for euros until 29 February 2012. Today, the only value that markka coins and banknotes have is their value as collectibles.

== See also ==
- Bank of Finland
- Scandinavian Monetary Union
- Adoption of the euro in Finland
- Finnish euro coins
- Economy of Finland
- History of money in Finland

Preceded by Russian ruble	Finnish currency 1860–2002	Succeeded by euro
