= Swedish penning =

The penning or penny was the Swedish variant of the Norwegian penning that was minted from about 1150 until 1548, and which remained as a unit of account in Sweden until 1777. Originally, penning was first minted in Norway by the Norwegian king Olaf Tryggvason from the year 995, and was later adapted in both Sweden and Denmark as a coin system.

The penning was minted in imitation of the pennies, pfennig and deniers issued elsewhere in Europe. However, although based on these coins, the accounting system was distinct, with different systems operating in different regions. All used the öre (derived from the Latin aureus) which was worth 1/8 of a mark or 3 örtugar. However, in Svealand, one öre was worth 24 penningar, but in Götaland it was worth 48 penningar and 36 in roughly the Diocese of Linköping and on Gotland. Around 1300, by royal command, the Svealand standard became the national standard, except on Gotland. The örtug was first minted around 1370 and the öre was issued as a coin from 1522. In 1524, however, the real örtug was replaced in minted form with a new one, also known as halvöre (half öre), which had a little higher value (whereas one mark was divided into 24 örtugar, it was divided into 16 halvöre), but the old örtug remained as a counting unit until 1777.

The conversion between the different units of currency in use at that time can be summarized as:

Denomination	Mark	Öre	Örtug	Penning
Daler	4	32	96	768
Mark		8	24	192
Öre			3	24
Örtug				8

In 1604, the daler was renamed the riksdaler. There followed a period of very complicated currency, during which both copper and silver versions of the different denominations circulated and the riksdaler rose in value relative to the other units. In 1777, the riksdaler became the basis of a new currency system and the penning ceased to exist.

The name lives on in the Norwegian language and Swedish language in the contracted form of the plural, pengar/penger, which means money.

== See also ==
- Norwegian penning, its former Norwegian interpretation
- penny, its British equivalent
- denier, its former French equivalent
- pfennig, its former German equivalent
