= Nicobar (1782 DAC ship) =

Historical ship

Nicobar, was an East Indiaman of the Danish Asiatic Company, built at Asiatisk Plads in 1782.

== Construction ==
The Nicobar was built on the Danish Asiatic Company's own dockyard in 1781. She was the 24th ship launched from Asiatisk Plads.

== Career ==
An example of plate money

The Nicobar was sent to Tranquebar in 1782. She was under the command of Capt. Andreas Christie. Her travel pass (afgangspas) was issued in May 1782. She arrived in False Bay in May 1783 and accepted several additional passengers. Some of the new passengers had just narrowly survived a shipwreck.

The Nicobar was wrecked on 11 July 1783, two months after arriving in False Bay, while departing for Bengal. Most of the crew, including several lascars, perished. Only 11 crew members survived.

In 1922, historian George McCall Theal made a note of the wreck in his posthumous History of Africa, saying that she "ran ashore near Cape Agulhas". Two fishermen discovered her wreck off Quoin Point in 1987. Three thousand examples of Swedish plate money were subsequently salvaged from the wreck. According to CoinWorld, many of the extant examples of lower-denomination plate money are from the Nicobar.
