= History of copper currency in Sweden =

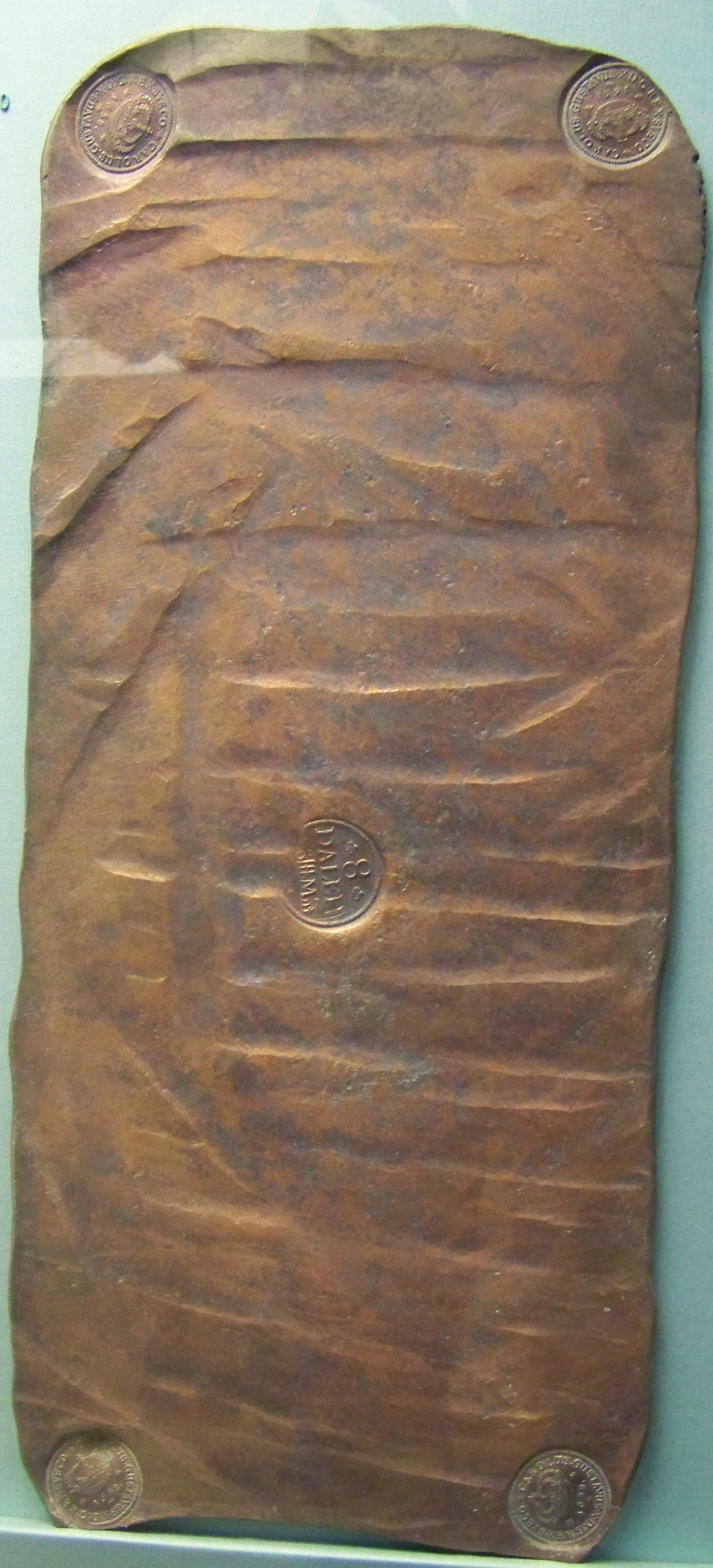
An 8 daler piece of plate money (plåtmynt) in the British Museum.

The Swedish Empire had the greatest and most numerous copper mines in Europe as it entered into its pre-eminence in the early 17th century as an emerging great power. Through poor fiscal policies and the First Treaty of Älvsborg, Sweden lost control of its reserves of precious metals, primarily silver, of which most had left to the burgeoning trade economy of Amsterdam. In 1607, the Swedish king Charles IX attempted to persuade the populace to exchange their silver-based currency for a copper-based coin of equal face value, though this offer was not generally taken up. Sweden's large army at the time was paid entirely in copper currency, further issued in large numbers by Gustavus II to finance the war efforts against Ferdinand II of Germany during the Thirty Years' War. The face value of the circulating copper coins now greatly exceeded the reserves of the state and production of the national economy, so the value of the currency quickly fell to its commodity value. In a country where copper was so abundant, that number was very small, because of which the savings of the people of Sweden were wiped out.

When Gustavus' daughter and heir Christina reached maturity at 18, after a brief fling with paper-based money backed by copper—which was well received initially but soon lost credibility—she began issuing copper in plates as large as fifteen kilograms to serve as currency. Unwieldy as they were, the copper-based monetary system worked to a certain extent until the world copper price collapsed. Sweden's copper no longer commanded the premium it once had on world markets and foreign income dried up. Relative to the rest of Europe, the people of Sweden had become poor once more.

In an effort to shore up the economy, the government minister Baron von Görtz stepped up to the challenge and became the country's central banker. He issued more copper-based currency without limit, with a face value of one daler (much greater than their intrinsic value) which were technically inferior and easy to counterfeit. Soon these coins were so abundant that they too depreciated rapidly towards their raw metal value. This was caused by a belief spreading rapidly, saying that the copper coins would soon be unacceptable as a form of payment of taxes. Görtz was blamed for the failure, and was beheaded in March of 1719, a punishment which greatly pleased the Swedish people. At the end of July 1768, plate money was abolished, but reintroduced on 4 August.

== See also ==
- Economy of Sweden
- History of Sweden
