= Fyrk =

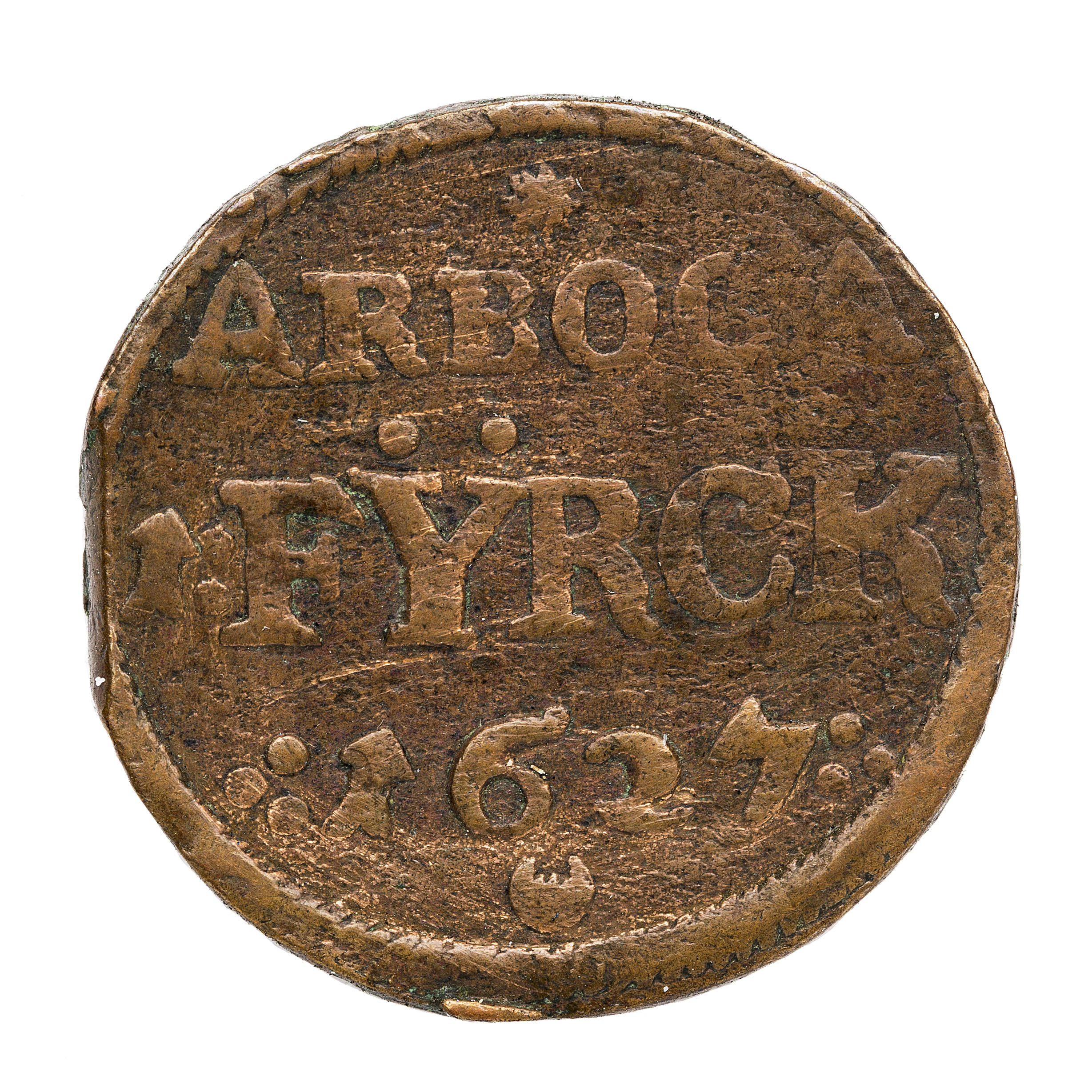
Copper fyrk from Arboga (1627)

A fyrk was a monetary unit used in Sweden in the 15th to 17th century, with a value of between 1/6 and 1/2 öre. The word is derived from Middle Low German vereken (vierichen) and ultimately from ver or vier, a monetary unit (from vier, "four"). After the monetary unit had been abolished, the word remained in use in the general sense of "small money", "pennies", "an insignificant sum"; and as a slang word for "money" in Finland Swedish, from where it is borrowed in Finnish slang (as fyrkka).

== History ==
With the Swedish municipal reforms of 1862, the unit fyrk was re-used as a unit for counting voting rights in the municipal election. Voting rights were graded according to income and assets, counted in fyrks and recorded in the fyrktalslängd, the "fyrk counting list" for each municipality. It was in use from 1863 to 1909. The vägfyrk or "road fyrk", a unit for road tax, remained in use until 1937.

Up until 17th Century, fyrks were minted from silver; later the copper was used as the value of the coin suffered continuous inflation.
