= Öre =

Unit of Swedish currency

Öre (Swedish pronunciation: [ˈœ̂ːrɛ]) is the centesimal subdivision of the Swedish krona. In the Swedish language, the plural of öre is either öre (indefinite) or ören (definitive).

The name öre derives from the Latin word aereus/aurum, meaning gold. The corresponding subdivisions of the Norwegian and Danish krones are called øre.

Öre coins have been withdrawn since 2010, but the unit remains.

== History ==
During the Middle Ages, the öre was a unit of Swedish currency equal to 1/8 of a mark, 3 örtugar or either 24, 36 or 48 penningar (depending on the geographical area in which it was used). It was already a unit of account in the 11th century, but was not minted as a coin until 1522. This öre was withdrawn in 1776, but returned in 1855 as 1/100 of the riksdaler. The riksdaler was replaced by the krona in 1873 (one riksdaler equalling one krona), but öre remained the name of the minor unit.

The last öre coin was withdrawn in 2010, but the centesimal subdivision is still used in non-cash contexts such as bank balances and cashless transactions, while bills to be paid in cash are rounded to the nearest krona.

== Coins ==
=== 1 Fyrk ===
1 Fyrk coin had a value of a part of 1 öre.

=== 1 öre ===
1 öre coins, by king 1844–1973

Monarch	Reverse	Obverse	Notes
Oscar I (1844–1859)			2.80 g, bronze; Obv: Head left; Obv. Legend: OSCAR SVERIGES...; Rev: Value, date within wreath
Charles XV (1859–1872)			2.70 g, bronze; Obv: Head left; Obv. Legend: CARL XV SVERIGES...; Rev: Value, date within wreath
Oscar II (1872–1907)			2.00 g, bronze; Obv: Crowned shield; Rev: Value and date flanked by crowns
Gustaf V (1907–1950)			2.00 g, bronze; Obv: Crowned monogram divides date; Rev: Value and crowns; Edge: Plain
Gustaf V (1907–1950)			1.75 g, iron; Obv: Crowned monogram divides date; Rev: Value and crowns; World War I issues
Gustaf VI Adolf (1950–1973)			2.00 g, bronze; Obv: Crown above; Rev: Value within circle divides date below crown; Edge: Plain

=== 5 öre ===
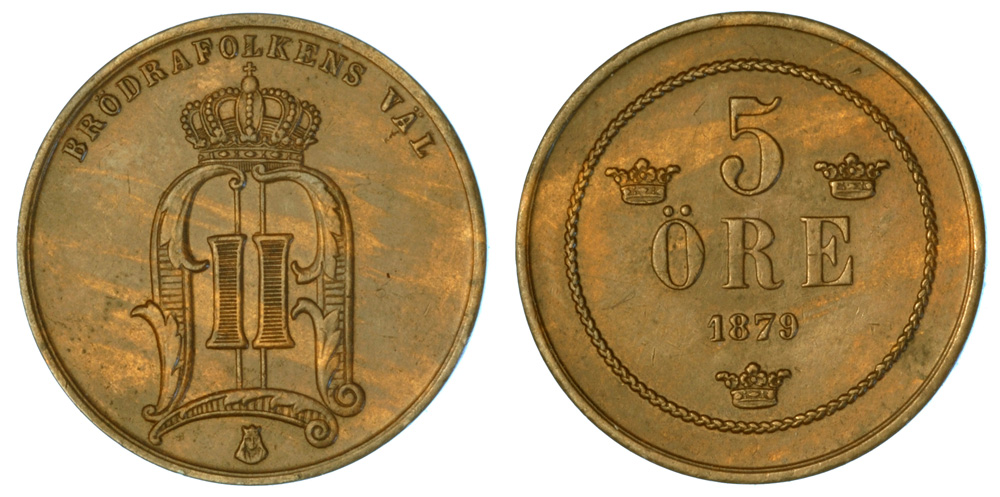
5 öre 1879

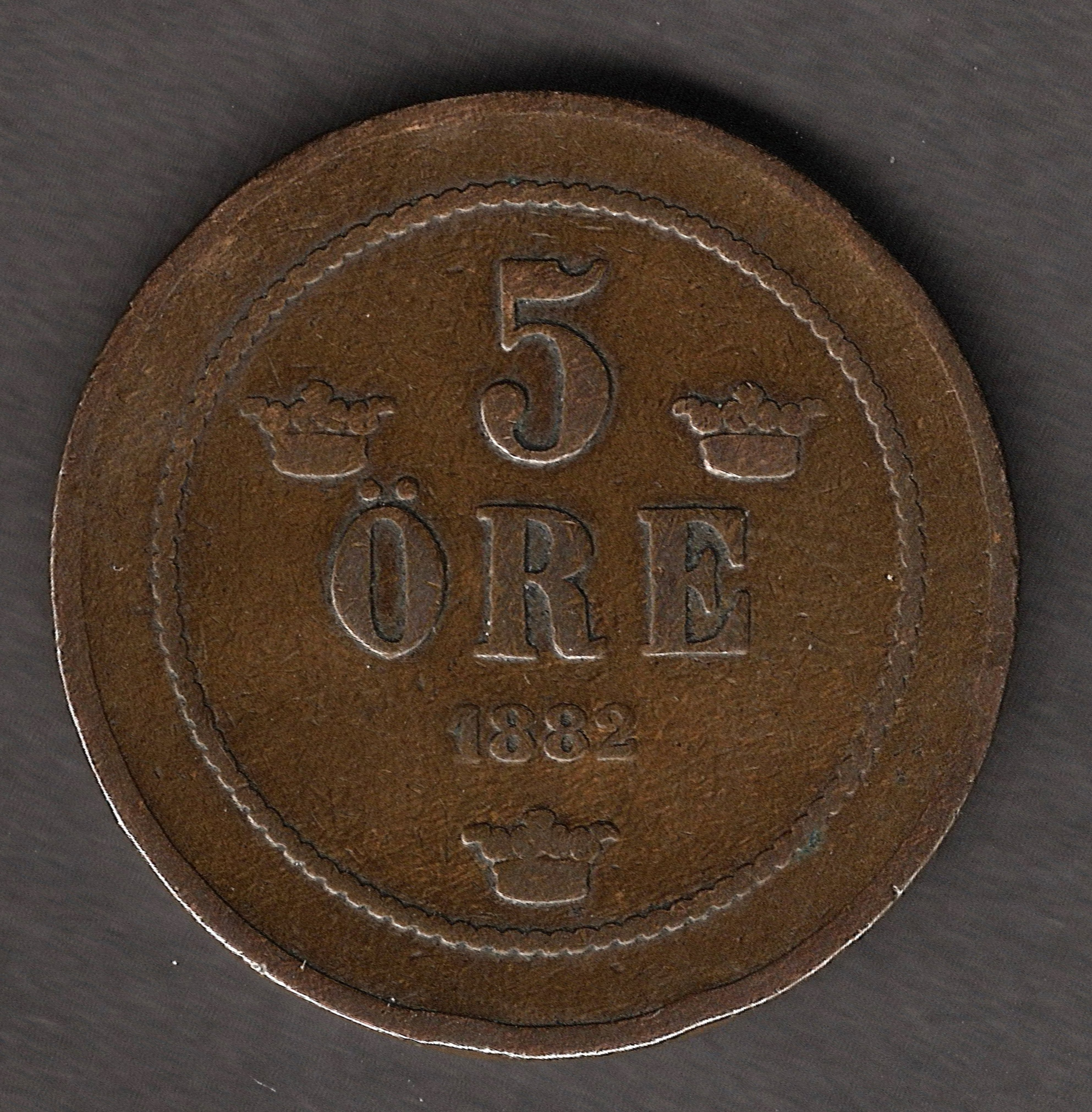
5 öre 1882

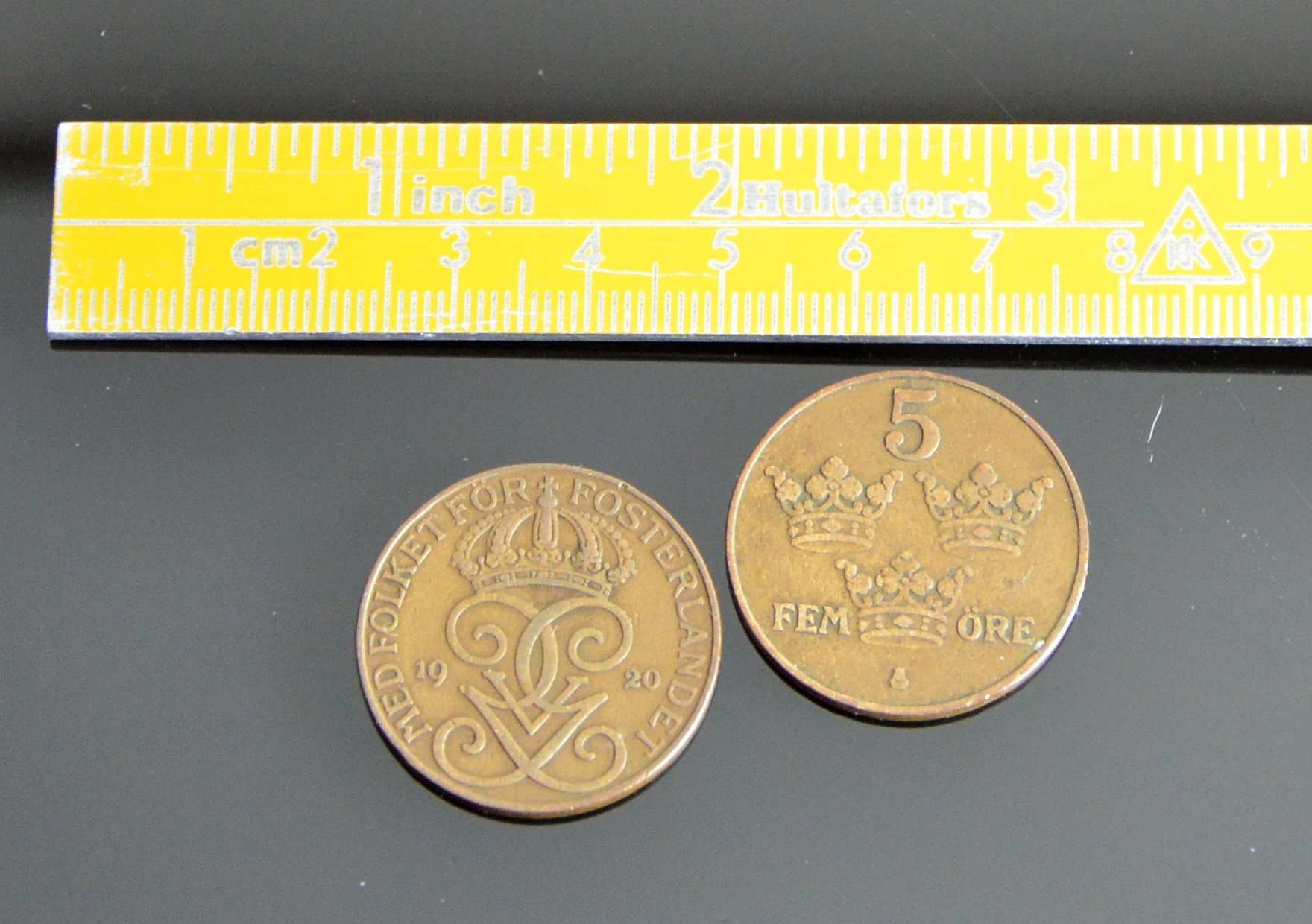
5 öre 1920

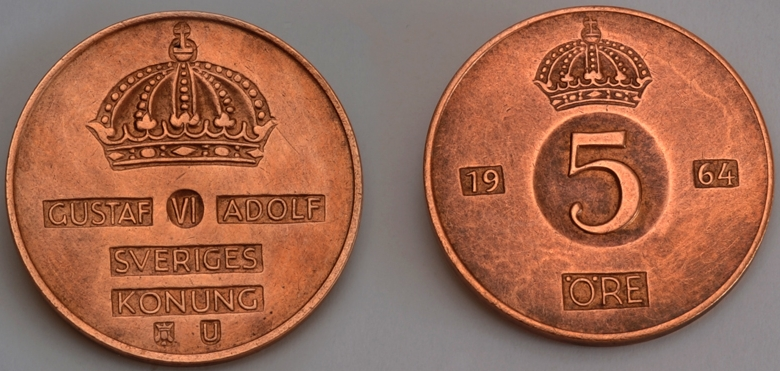
5 öre 1964

Amount placed in middle; Date split by amount; Crown at head. (Obverse) Larger crown, Name of monarch.

=== 10 öre ===
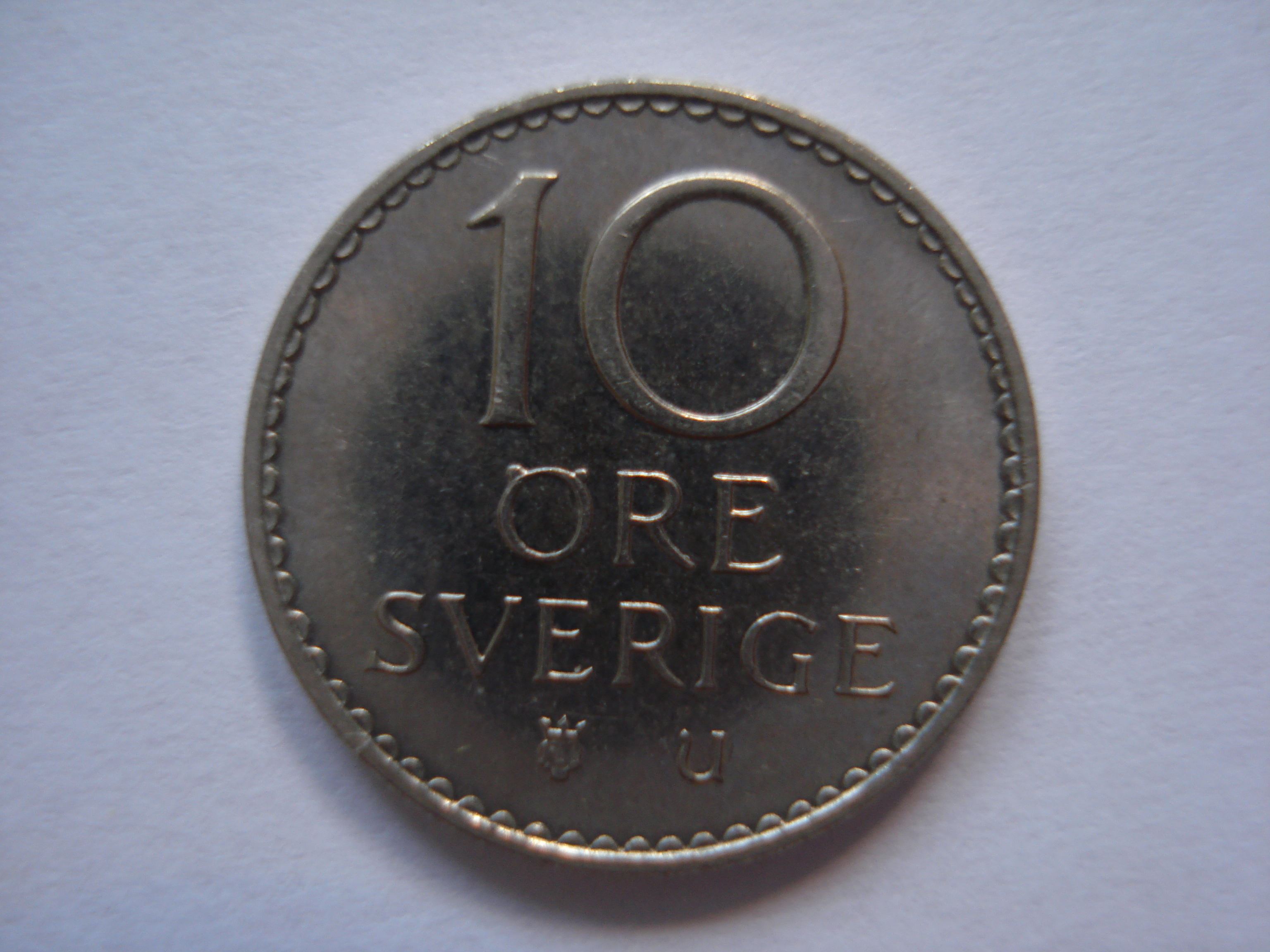
10 öre 1973

=== 25 öre ===
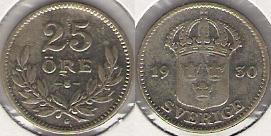
25 öre 1930

=== 50 öre ===
Fifty öre
- Sweden
- Value: 0.5 SEK
- Mass: 3.7 g
- Diameter: 18.75 mm
- Thickness: 1.80 mm
- Edge: Plain
- Composition: 97% copper, 2.5% zinc and 0.5% tin
- Years of minting: 1992–2009

Obverse

Reverse

From October 1992, the only coin in use in Sweden with a value below 1 kronor was the 50 öre coin. On 18 December 2008, the Swedish Riksbank announced a recommendation to the Swedish government to phase out the final öre coin by 2010. The coin ceased to be minted on 25 March 2009 and ceased to be legal tender after 30 September 2010.

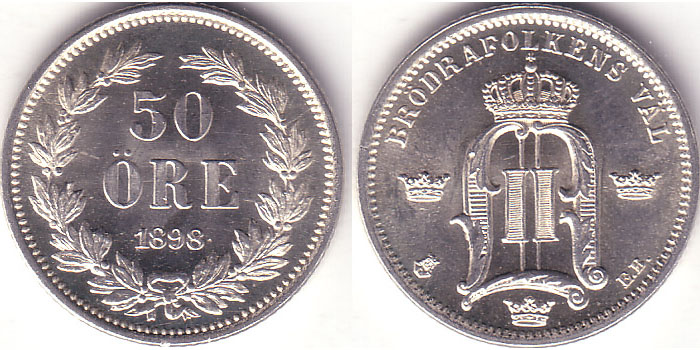
50 öre 1898

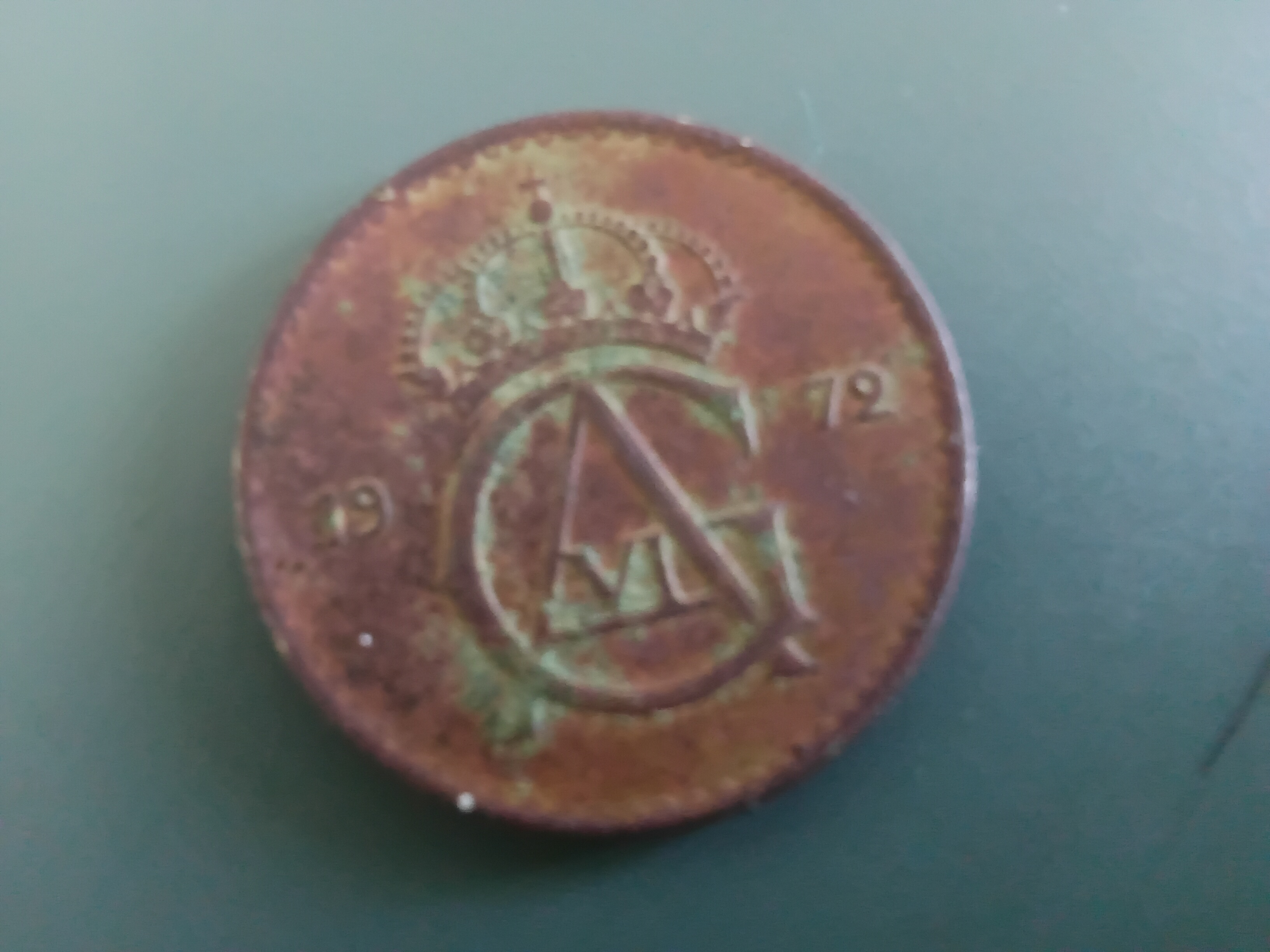
50 öre 1972

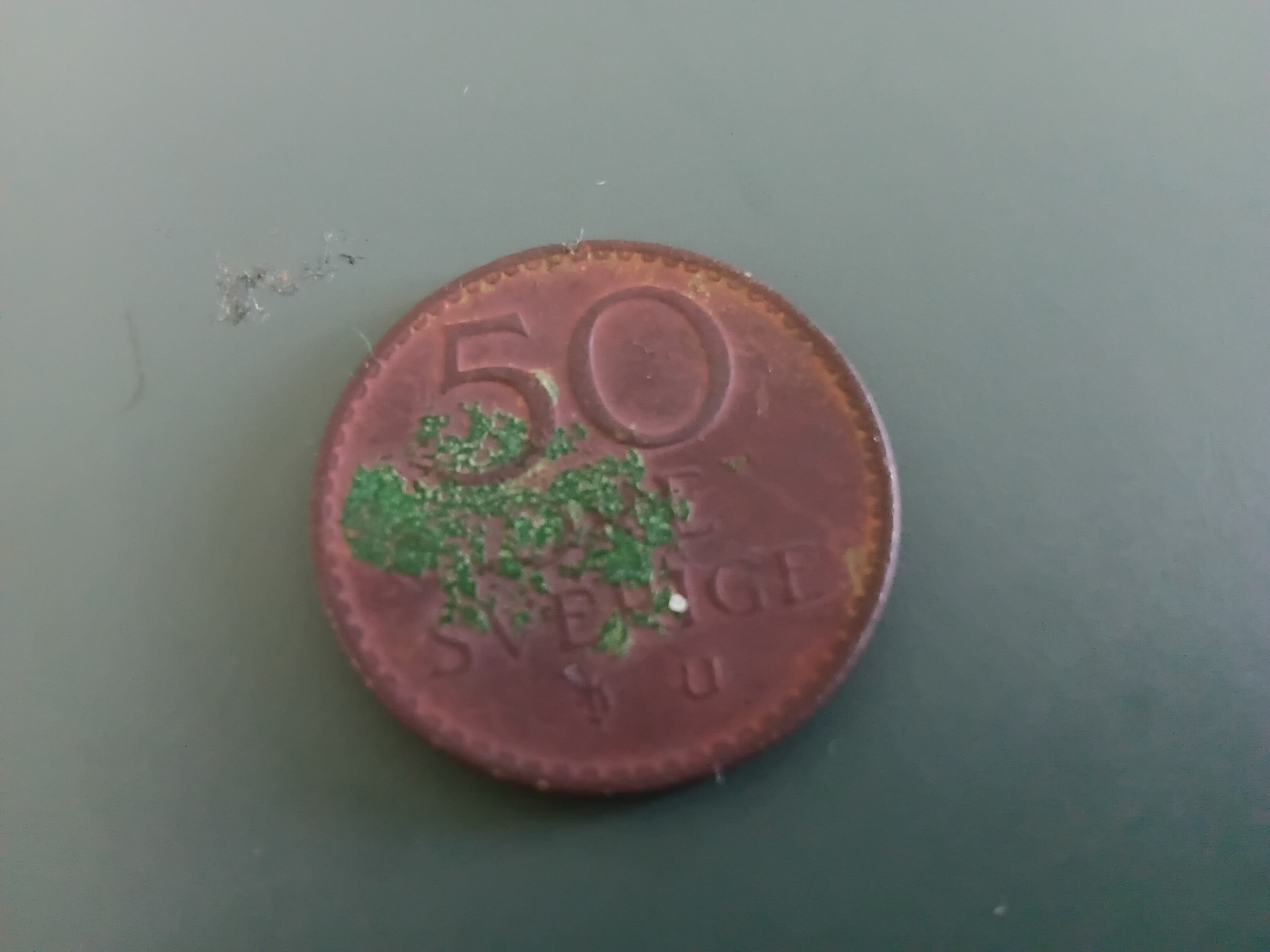
50 öre 1972 (reverse)

== See also ==
Other coin with names deriving from the gold of which they were once made:

- Øre
- Guilder
- Polish złoty#First złoty
