= Swedish riksdaler =

Pre-1873 currency unit in Sweden

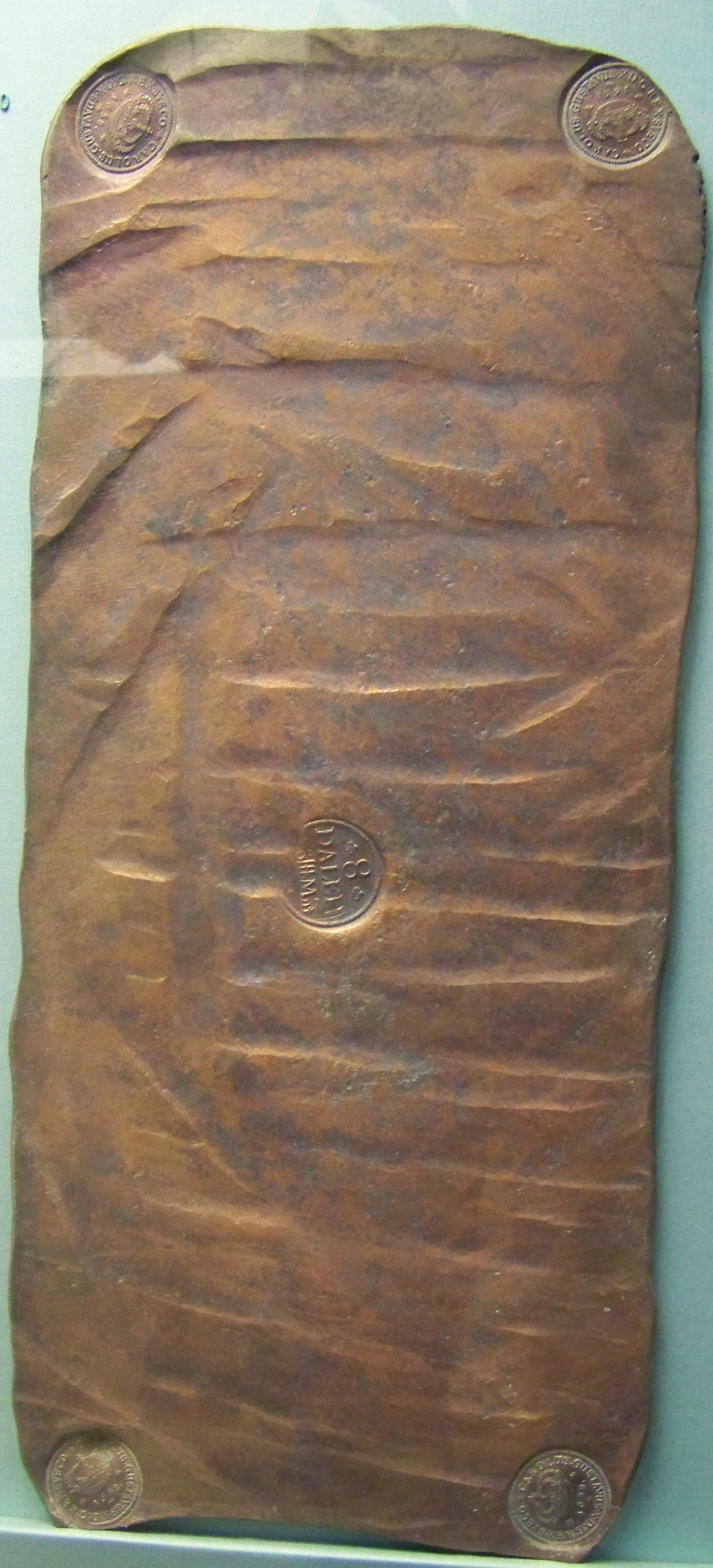
An 8 daler piece of plate money (plåtmynt) at the British Museum

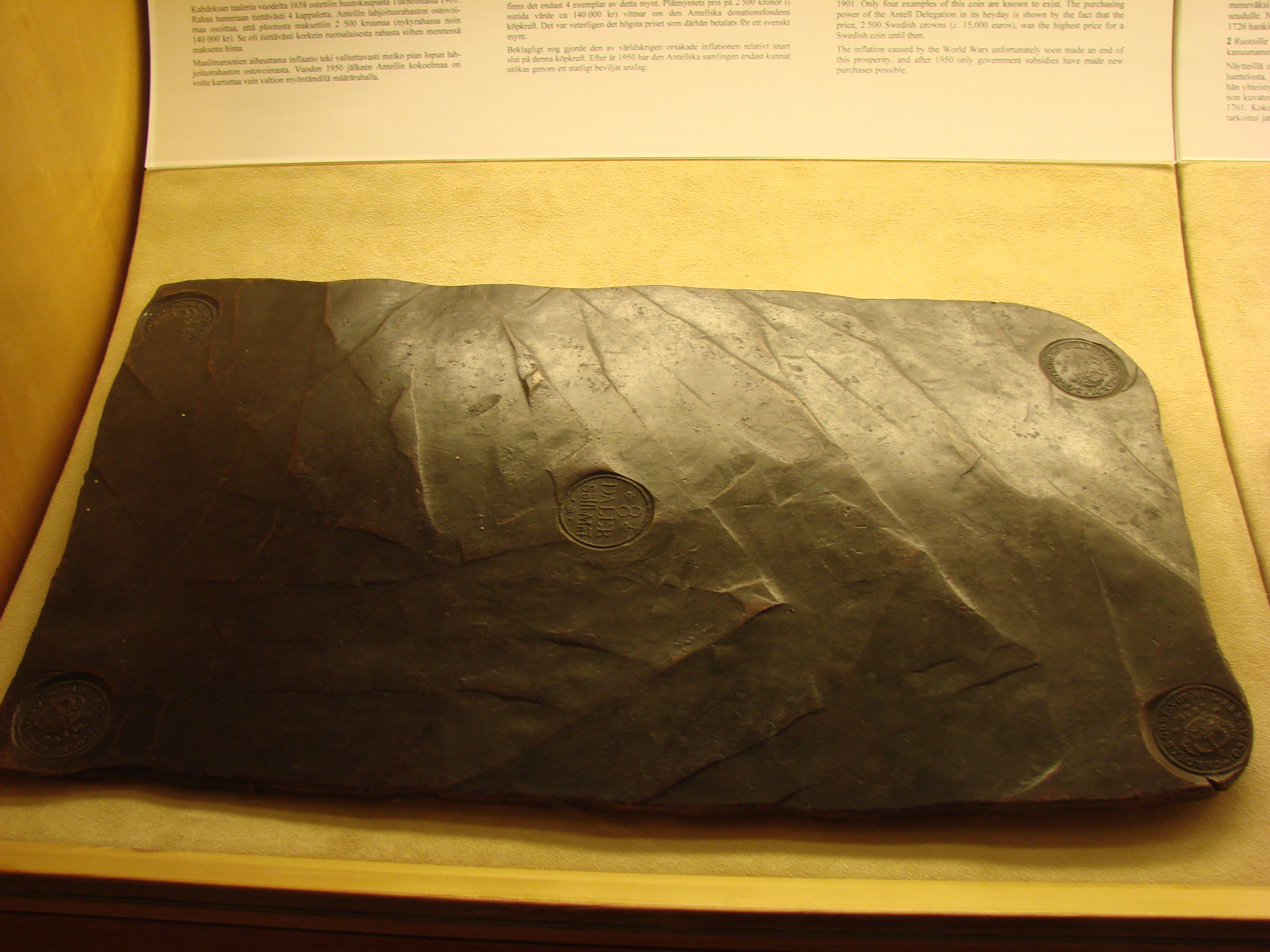
plate money (plåtmynt) in Finland

The Svenska riksdaler (Swedish pronunciation: [rɪksˈdɑːlɛr]) was the name of a Swedish coin first minted in 1604. Between 1777 and 1873, it was the currency of Sweden. The daler, like the dollar, was named after the German Thaler. The similarly named Reichsthaler, rijksdaalder, and rigsdaler were used in the Holy Roman Empire and Austria-Hungary, the Netherlands, and Denmark-Norway, respectively. Riksdaler is still used as a colloquial term for krona, Sweden's modern-day currency.

== History ==
=== Penning accounting system ===
The daler was introduced in 1534. It was initially intended for international use and was divided into 4 marks and then a mark is further subdivided into 8 öre and then an öre is further subdivided into 24 pennings. In 1604, the name was changed to riksdaler ("daler of the realm", cf. Reichsthaler). In 1609, the riksdaler rose to a value of 6 mark when the other Swedish coins were debased but the riksdaler remained constant.

From 1624, daler was issued in copper as well as silver. Because of the low value of copper, large plate money (plåtmynt) was issued. These were rectangular pieces of copper weighing in some cases several kilograms, with the largest one worth 10 daler and weighing almost 20 kilograms (44 lb). They circulated until 1776. As silver became scarce, the silver daler rose in value relative to the copper daler, with the exchange rate between the two eventually being set at a ratio of three to one. Denominations in copper money were marked K.M. or KMT, with S.M. or SMT denoting silver money.

The cumbersome size and weight of plate money eventually prompted Sweden to become the first country in Europe to issue banknotes. These were issued by Stockholms Banco in 1661. The notes lost much of their value due to overproduction but succeeded in alleviating the immediate problem. They were issued until 1667. In 1681, the silver daler was debased, so that one riksdaler became equal to two silver dalers. A further debasement in 1712 resulted in one riksdaler equalling three silver daler. At the end of July 1768 the heavy plate money was abolished but reintroduced on 4 August out of need.

The wreck of the Nicobar is the source of many examples of plate money in the modern period.

=== Riksdaler accounting system ===
In 1776, a new currency system was announced, which came into use at the beginning of 1777. The new currency was based on the riksdaler subdivided into 48 skilling (worth two old öre, sometimes spelled schilling with the plural schillingar), with each skilling further subdivided into 12 rundstycken. Copper coins were halved in value and only the most recent silver coins retained their face values.

The new currency was issued in banknotes (fiat money) and silver and copper coins. At first, only the Riksens Ständers Wexel-Banco (the Bank of the Riksdag of the Estates) could issue banknotes but, in 1789, the Riksgälds Kontor (Swedish National Debt Office) was established and given the right to issue its own banknotes. The riksdaler specie was minted in silver, the riksdaler banco was issued by the Bank and the riksdaler riksgälds was issued by the Debt Office. Both the Bank and Debt Office issued copper coins.

The riksdaler specie was minted in 25.5 g fine silver and corresponded to the Reichsthaler specie (or rigsdaler specie) used in the rest of Scandinavia and Northern Germany. In contrast, the banknotes suffered heavily from a seigniorage induced inflation. In 1803, the values of the two paper moneys were tied, with 1 riksdaler banco = 1 1/2 riksdaler riksgälds. In 1830, the exchange rate to the silver coinage was also fixed, with 1 riksdaler specie = 2 2/3 riksdaler banco = 4 riksdaler riksgälds. The value of the copper coins of the Riksens Ständers Wexel-Banco fell (relative to silver) in line with the bank's paper money. Thus, from 1830, there were 128 bank skilling to the riksdaler specie and these became the new standard subdivision of the riksdaler specie in 1834, carrying the name skilling banco.

=== Coins ===
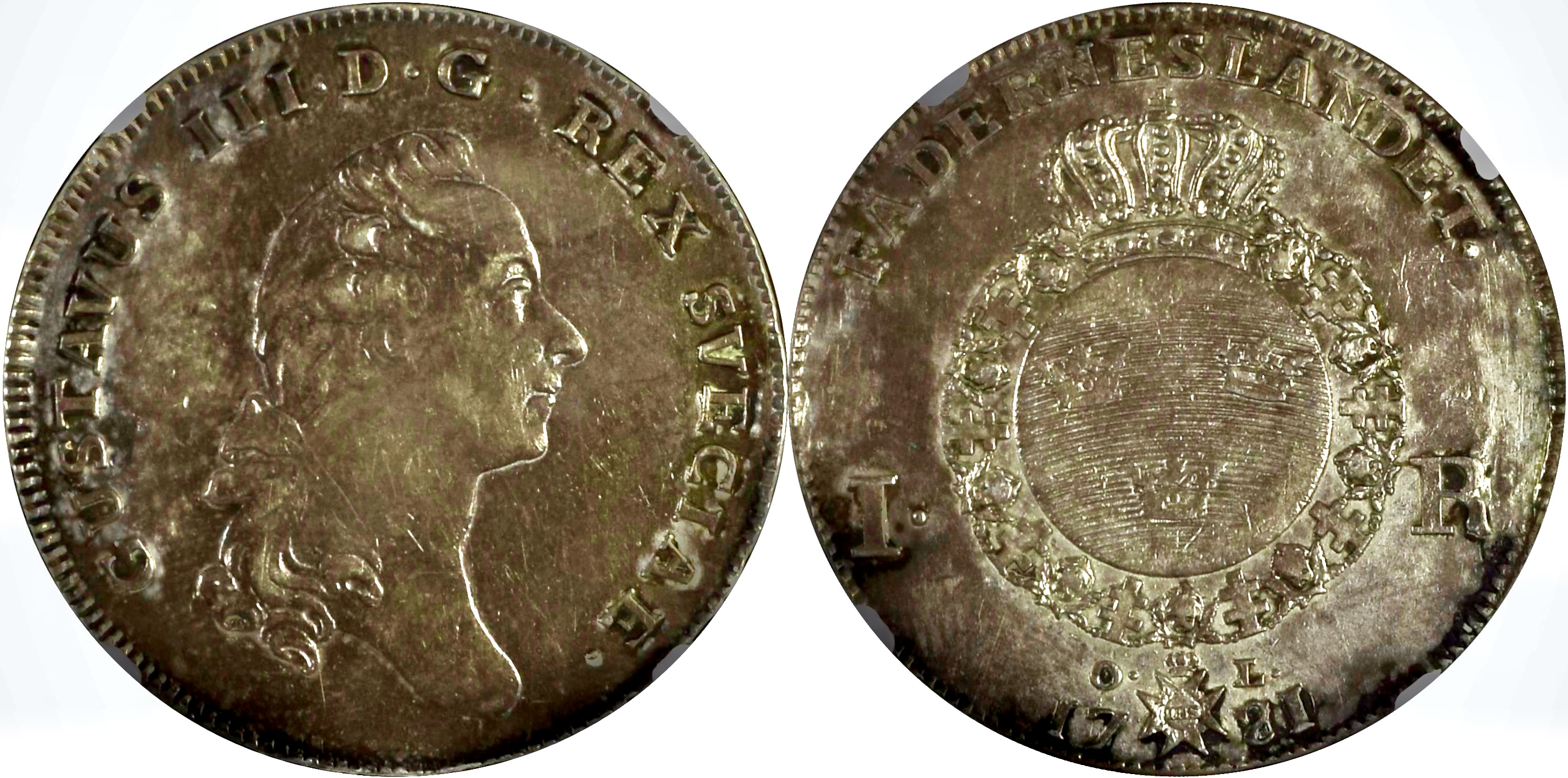
Silver coin: 1 Riksdaler with the portrait of King Gustav III on the front, the deep side is the royal seal, minted in 1781

In the 1770s, before the introduction of the new currency, coins were being issued in denominations of 1 öre K.M., 1, 2, 4, 8 and 16 öre S.M., 1 and 2 daler S.M. and 1 riksdaler.

After the reform of 1777, silver coins were issued in denominations of 1/24, 1/12, 1/6, 1/3, 2/3 and 1 riksdaler. The Riksgäldskontoret issued 1/4 and 1/2 skilling tokens (pollet) between 1799 and 1802, followed by issues of the Riksens Ständers Wexel-Banco in denominations of 1/12, 1/4, 1/2 and 1 skilling from 1802.

In 1830, following the fixing of the relationship between the copper and silver coinages and the various paper money issues, copper 1/6 skilling were introduced, together with a new silver coinage in denominations of 1/12, 1/8, 1/4 and 1/2 riksdaler. The new silver coins were all struck in .750 fineness and were weight related. Production of 1/12 skilling, 1/24, 1/6 and 1/3 riksdaler ceased.

In 1835, a new copper coinage was introduced, consisting of 1/6, 1/3, 2/3, 1 and 2 skilling banco, along with silver 1/16 riksdaler pieces. Production of the 1/12 riksdaler ceased. Copper 4 skilling coins were introduced in 1849, followed by silver 1/32 riksdaler in 1851. These last two coins, which were equal in value, were only minted until 1855 and 1853, respectively.

=== Banknotes ===
Between 1661 and 1667, Stockholms Banco issued notes in a large range of denominations of riksdaler specie (50 up to 1000), silver daler (50 up to 1000) and copper daler (12 1/2 up to 1000). Paper money production resumed in 1701, with issued from the Kongliga (later Riksens) Ständers Wexel-Banco. Many of these notes had the value written in by hand at the time of issue. Printed denominations were 6, 9, 12, 24 and 36 copper daler (daler KMT).

In 1777, banknotes were introduced in denominations of 2 and 3 riksdaler, although notes with hand written amounts continued to be issued until 1836. In 1802, smaller denominations of 8, 12 and 16 schillingar were introduced, followed by notes for 10 and 14 skillingar in 1803.

The Riksgälds Kontor introduced notes with handwritten denominations in 1790. Printed denominations of 12, 16 and 24 schillingar, 1, 2 and 5 riksdaler were introduced in 1791, followed by 10, 50 and 100 riksdaler in 1816. The Riksgälds Kontor ceased printing paper money in 1834.

From 1834, the Riksens Ständers Wexel-Bank issued notes for 8, 12 and 16 schillingar banco and 2 and 3 riksdaler banco. The schillingar banco notes were issued until 1849 but the riksdaler notes were only issued until 1836.

Between 1835 and 1836, the Rikes Ständers Bank introduced notes in denominations of 32 skilling banco, 2, 6 2/3, 10, 16 2/3, 33 1/3, 100 and 500 riksdaler banco. The notes were also marked with the denominations in riksdaler riksgälds (1, 3, 10, 15, 25, 50, 150 and 750) and riksdaler specie (1/4, 3/4, 2 1/2, 3 3/4, 6 1/2, 12 1/2, 37 1/2 and 187 1/2). The last of these notes were produced in 1857.

=== Decimal system from 1855 ===
In 1855 two reforms took place, the introduction a decimal system, and a switch in the main currency unit from "banco" to "riksgälds" (which was renamed as the riksdaler riksmynt). One riksdaler specie was equal to 4 riksdaler riksmynt, each of which was divided into 100 öre.

The reforms of 1855 introduced a new coinage, consisting of bronze 1/2, 1, 2 and 5 öre, silver 10, 25 and 50 öre, 1 and 2 riksdaler riksmynt and 1 riksdaler specie. The silver coins retained the .750 fineness of the preceding issues, causing the 10 öre coin to weigh just 0.85 grams.

From 1858, the Rikes Ständers Bank issued banknotes for 1, 5, 10, 50, 100, 500 and 1000 riksdaler riksmynt. Production of these notes was taken over by Sveriges Riksbank in 1869, with the notes issued until 1873.

The Scandinavian Monetary Union replaced the riksdaler riksmynt in 1873 with a new currency, the krona. An equal valued krone/krona of the monetary union replaced the three Scandinavian currencies at the rate of 1 krone/krona = 1/2 Danish rigsdaler = 1/4 Norwegian speciedaler = 1 Swedish riksdaler riksmynt.

== See also ==
- History of copper currency in Sweden, Swedish krona
- Danish rigsdaler, Danish krone
- Icelandic króna
- Norwegian rigsdaler, Norwegian speciedaler, Norwegian krone
