= Örtug =

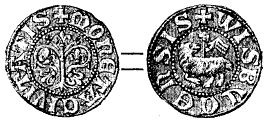
Örtug from Gotland (the city of Visby)

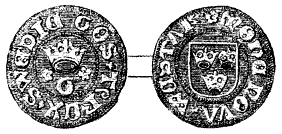
Örtug from the city of Västerås, during the reign of Gustav Vasa

Örtug or ortig (Finnish: äyrityinen, aurto or aurtua) was a medieval currency unit in Sweden. It was originally minted as a silver coin in 1370 during the reign of king Albert of Sweden. The coin weighed about 1.3 grams and consisted of 81% silver. As time passed, the örtug was debased: during the reign of Eric of Pomerania, the örtug contained 0.88 grams of silver; under Christian I, 0.7 grams; and in 1534 only 0.54 grams of silver.

During the reign of Gustav Vasa (1523–1560), the monetary system of Sweden was reformed: an örtug was now subdivided into 12 pennings, not 8 as before, while still valued as one third of an öre.

Örtug coins were struck during the years 1523–1534; 1535–1540 in Stockholm; 1528–1531 in Västerås and 1589–1589 in Stockholm and Uppsala. Production ceased after another monetary reform in 1776.

The örtug is also used as the official name of the currency in the artist Lars Vilks' micronation of Ladonia.

| Denomination | Mark | Öre | Örtug | Penning |
|---|---|---|---|---|
| Daler | 4 | 32 | 96 | 768 |
| Mark | | 8 | 24 | 192 |
| Öre | | | 3 | 24 |
| Örtug | | | | 8 |

== See also ==
- Swedish penning
- Mark (money)
- Öre
- Ladonia (micronation)
