= Outline of Sweden =

Country in Scandinavia in Northern Europe

The Flag of Sweden

The Greater state arms of Sweden

Location of Sweden in Northern Europe.

Flagmap of Sweden

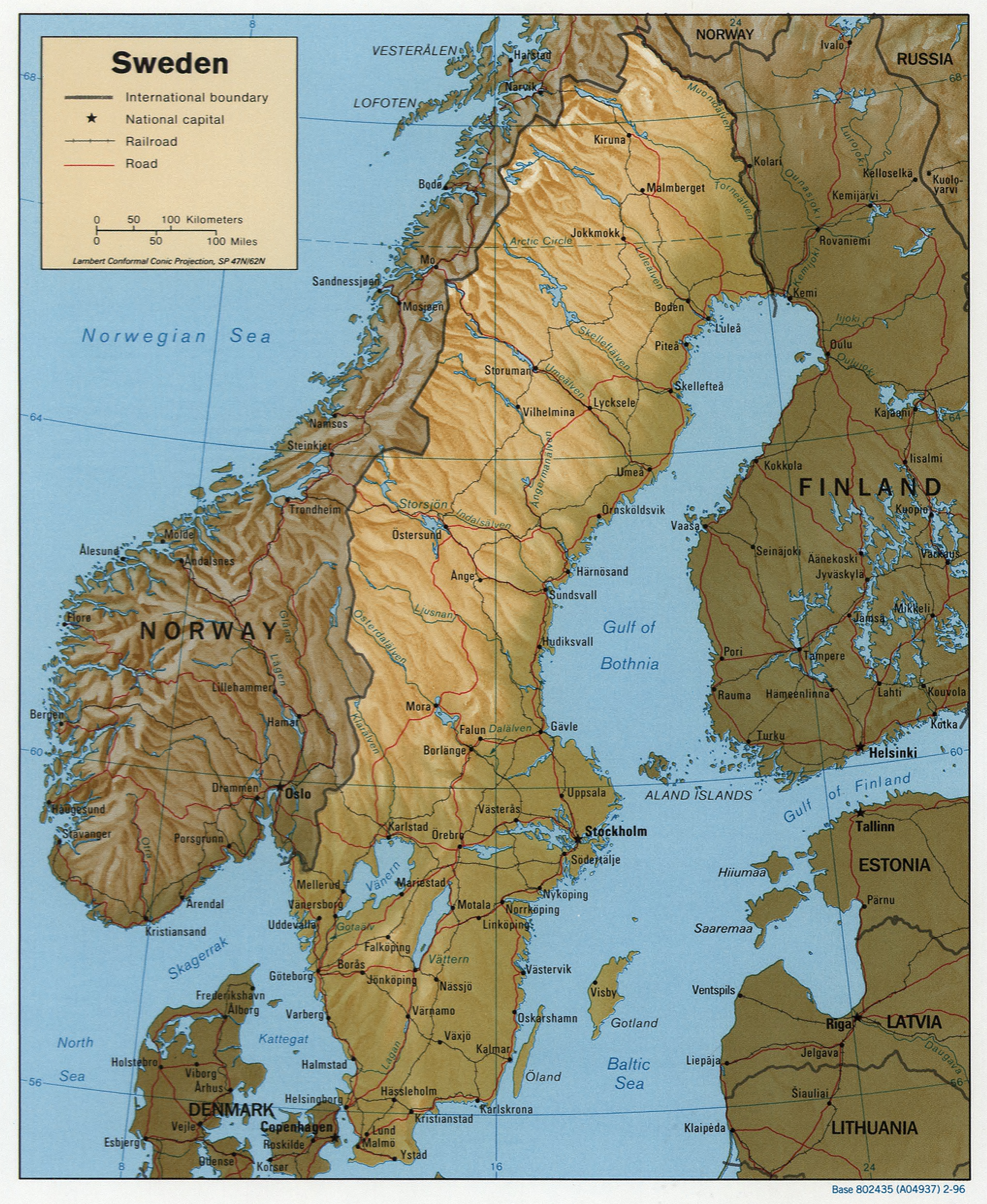
An enlargeable relief map of the Kingdom of Sweden

The following outline is provided as an overview of and topical guide to Sweden:

Sweden – Scandinavian country in Northern Europe, situated between Norway and Finland. Sweden maintained a policy of neutrality in armed conflicts from 1814 until 2009, when it entered into various mutual defence treaties. Sweden joined NATO in 2024. It is a member of the European Union, but retains its own currency (the krona). Swedish icons include Sweden's quality of life, its neutrality, public health care, cars (Volvo, Saab), furniture (IKEA), blonds and pop music performers (ABBA, Roxette, and Avicii).

== General reference ==
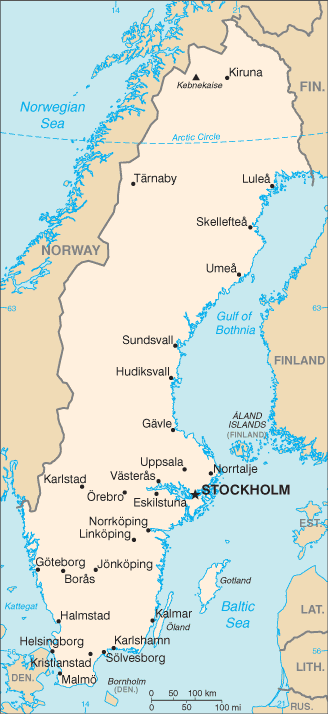
An enlargeable basic map of Sweden

- Pronunciation (in English): /ˈswiːdən/
- Common English country name: Sweden
- Official English country name: Kingdom of Sweden
- Common endonym(s): Sverige
- Official endonym(s): Konungariket Sverige
- Adjectival(s): Swedish
- Demonym(s): Swedish, Swedes
- Etymology: Name of Sweden
- International rankings of Sweden
- ISO country codes: SE, SWE, 752
- ISO region codes: See ISO 3166-2:SE
- Internet country code top-level domain: .se

== Geography of Sweden ==
Geography of Sweden

- Sweden is: a Nordic country
- Location:
  - The regions that Sweden is located in are:
    - Northern Hemisphere and Eastern Hemisphere
    - Eurasia
      - Europe
        - Northern Europe
          - Scandinavia
            - Scandinavian Peninsula
  - Time zone: Central European Time (UTC+01), Central European Summer Time (UTC+02)
  - Extreme points of Sweden
    - High: Kebnekaise 2,096.8 m (6,879 ft)
    - Low: Kristianstad −2.4 m (−8 ft)
  - Land boundaries: 2,233 km

Norway 1,619 km
Finland 614 km

- Coastline: 3,218 km

- Population of Sweden: 10,065,389 (July 31, 2017) - 89th most populous country
- Area of Sweden: 449,964 km^{2}
- Atlas of Sweden

=== Environment of Sweden ===
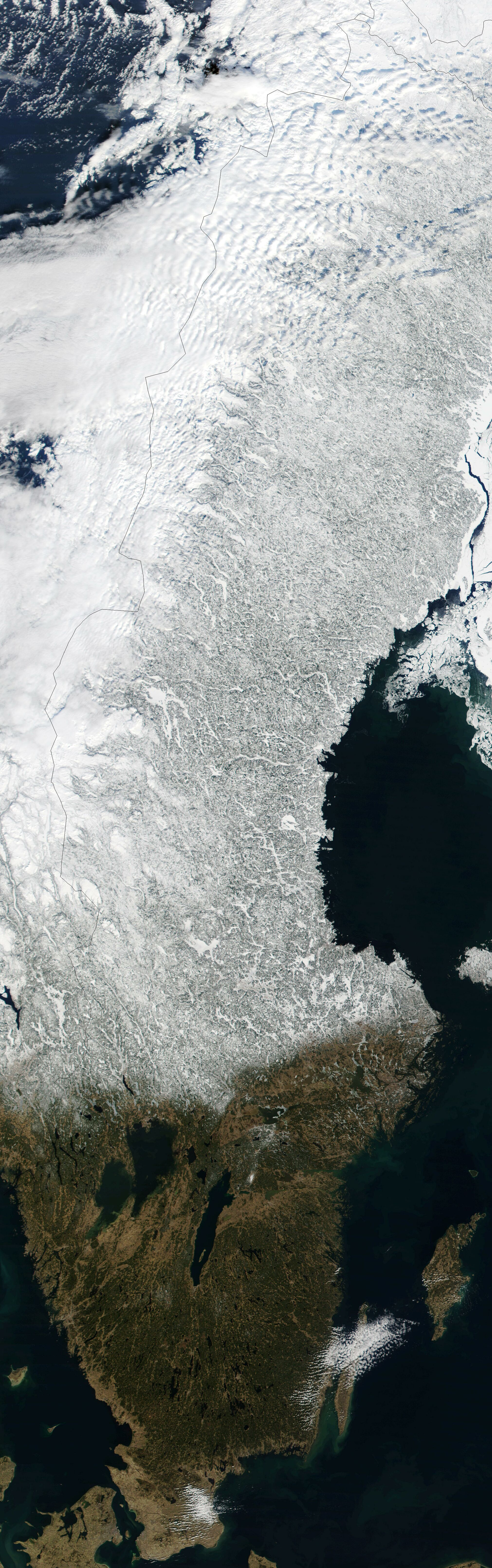
An enlargeable satellite image of Sweden

- Climate of Sweden
  - Climate change in Sweden
- Renewable energy in Sweden
- Geology of Sweden
- Protected areas of Sweden
  - Biosphere reserves in Sweden
  - National parks of Sweden
- Wildlife of Sweden
  - Fauna of Sweden
    - Amphibians and reptiles of Sweden
    - Birds of Sweden
    - Fish in Sweden
    - Insects of Sweden
      - Ants of Sweden
      - Butterflies of Sweden
      - Moths of Sweden
    - Mammals of Sweden
    - Molluscs of Sweden
  - Flora of Sweden
    - List of lichens of Sweden

==== Natural geographic features of Sweden ====
- Forests of Sweden
- Islands of Sweden
- Lakes of Sweden
- Mountains of Sweden
  - Glaciers of Sweden
- Rivers of Sweden
- World Heritage Sites in Sweden

=== Regions of Sweden ===
Regions of Sweden

==== Ecoregions of Sweden ====
List of ecoregions in Sweden

- Ecoregions in Sweden

==== Administrative divisions of Sweden ====
Administrative divisions of Sweden

- Counties of Sweden – first-level administrative and political subdivisions of Sweden, of which there are 21.
  - Municipalities of Sweden – Sweden's lower-level local government entities, of which there are 290.
    - Districts of Sweden – municipalities in Sweden are in some rare cases divided into smaller districts.
- Provinces of Sweden – 25 historical, geographical or cultural regions that have no administrative function, but remain historical legacies and the means of cultural identification.

===== Counties of Sweden =====
Counties of Sweden

- Stockholm County
- Västerbotten County
- Norrbotten County
- Uppsala County
- Södermanland County
- Östergötland County
- Jönköping County
- Kronoberg County
- Kalmar County
- Gotland County
- Blekinge County
- Skåne County
- Halland County
- Västra Götaland County
- Värmland County
- Örebro County
- Västmanland County
- Dalarna County
- Gävleborg County
- Västernorrland County
- Jämtland County

===== Municipalities of Sweden =====
Municipalities of Sweden

- Capital of Sweden: Stockholm
- Cities of Sweden
- Ale Municipality
- Alingsås Municipality
- Alvesta Municipality
- Aneby Municipality
- Arboga Municipality
- Arjeplog Municipality
- Arvidsjaur Municipality
- Arvika Municipality
- Askersund Municipality
- Avesta Municipality
- Bengtsfors Municipality
- Berg Municipality
- Bjurholm Municipality
- Bjuv Municipality
- Boden Municipality
- Bollebygd Municipality
- Bollnäs Municipality
- Borgholm Municipality
- Borlänge Municipality
- Borås Municipality
- Botkyrka Municipality
- Boxholm Municipality
- Bromölla Municipality
- Bräcke Municipality
- Burlöv Municipality
- Båstad Municipality
- Dals-Ed Municipality
- Danderyd Municipality
- Degerfors Municipality
- Dorotea Municipality
- Eda Municipality
- Ekerö Municipality
- Eksjö Municipality
- Emmaboda Municipality
- Enköping Municipality
- Eskilstuna Municipality
- Eslöv Municipality
- Essunga Municipality
- Fagersta Municipality
- Falkenberg Municipality
- Falköping Municipality
- Falun Municipality
- Filipstad Municipality
- Finspång Municipality
- Flen Municipality
- Forshaga Municipality
- Färgelanda Municipality
- Gagnef Municipality
- Gislaved Municipality
- Gnesta Municipality
- Gnosjö Municipality
- Gotland Municipality
- Grums Municipality
- Grästorp Municipality
- Gullspång Municipality
- Gällivare Municipality
- Gävle Municipality
- Göteborg Municipality
- Götene Municipality
- Habo Municipality
- Hagfors Municipality
- Hallsberg Municipality
- Hallstahammar Municipality
- Halmstad Municipality
- Hammarö Municipality
- Haninge Municipality
- Haparanda Municipality
- Heby Municipality
- Hedemora Municipality
- Helsingborg Municipality
- Herrljunga Municipality
- Hjo Municipality
- Hofors Municipality
- Huddinge Municipality
- Hudiksvall Municipality
- Hultsfred Municipality
- Hylte Municipality
- Håbo Municipality
- Hällefors Municipality
- Härjedalen Municipality
- Härnösand Municipality
- Härryda Municipality
- Hässleholm Municipality
- Höganäs Municipality
- Högsby Municipality
- Hörby Municipality
- Höör Municipality
- Jokkmokk Municipality
- Järfälla Municipality
- Jönköping Municipality
- Kalix Municipality
- Kalmar Municipality
- Karlsborg Municipality
- Karlshamn Municipality
- Karlskoga Municipality
- Karlskrona Municipality
- Karlstad Municipality
- Katrineholm Municipality
- Kil Municipality
- Kinda Municipality
- Kiruna Municipality
- Klippan Municipality
- Knivsta Municipality
- Kramfors Municipality
- Kristianstad Municipality
- Kristinehamn Municipality
- Krokom Municipality
- Kumla Municipality
- Kungsbacka Municipality
- Kungsör Municipality
- Kungälv Municipality
- Kävlinge Municipality
- Köping Municipality
- Laholm Municipality
- Landskrona Municipality
- Laxå Municipality
- Lekeberg Municipality
- Leksand Municipality
- Lerum Municipality
- Lessebo Municipality
- Lidingö Municipality
- Lidköping Municipality
- Lilla Edet Municipality
- Lindesberg Municipality
- Linköping Municipality
- Ljungby Municipality
- Ljusdal Municipality
- Ljusnarsberg Municipality
- Lomma Municipality
- Ludvika Municipality
- Luleå Municipality
- Lund Municipality
- Lycksele Municipality
- Lysekil Municipality
- Malmö Municipality
- Malung-Sälen Municipality
- Malå Municipality
- Mariestad Municipality
- Mark Municipality
- Markaryd Municipality
- Mellerud Municipality
- Mjölby Municipality
- Mora Municipality
- Motala Municipality
- Mullsjö Municipality
- Munkedal Municipality
- Munkfors Municipality
- Mölndal Municipality
- Mönsterås Municipality
- Mörbylånga Municipality
- Nacka Municipality
- Nora Municipality
- Norberg Municipality
- Nordanstig Municipality
- Nordmaling Municipality
- Norrköping Municipality
- Norrtälje Municipality
- Norsjö Municipality
- Nybro Municipality
- Nykvarn Municipality
- Nyköping Municipality
- Nynäshamn Municipality
- Nässjö Municipality
- Ockelbo Municipality
- Olofström Municipality
- Orsa Municipality
- Orust Municipality
- Osby Municipality
- Oskarshamn Municipality
- Ovanåker Municipality
- Oxelösund Municipality
- Pajala Municipality
- Partille Municipality
- Perstorp Municipality
- Piteå Municipality
- Ragunda Municipality
- Robertsfors Municipality
- Ronneby Municipality
- Rättvik Municipality
- Sala Municipality
- Salem Municipality
- Sandviken Municipality
- Sigtuna Municipality
- Simrishamn Municipality
- Sjöbo Municipality
- Skara Municipality
- Skellefteå Municipality
- Skinnskatteberg Municipality
- Skurup Municipality
- Skövde Municipality
- Smedjebacken Municipality
- Sollefteå Municipality
- Sollentuna Municipality
- Solna Municipality
- Sorsele Municipality
- Sotenäs Municipality
- Staffanstorp Municipality
- Stenungsund Municipality
- Stockholm Municipality
- Storfors Municipality
- Storuman Municipality
- Strängnäs Municipality
- Strömstad Municipality
- Strömsund Municipality
- Sundbyberg Municipality
- Sundsvall Municipality
- Sunne Municipality
- Surahammar Municipality
- Svalöv Municipality
- Svedala Municipality
- Svenljunga Municipality
- Säffle Municipality
- Säter Municipality
- Sävsjö Municipality
- Söderhamn Municipality
- Söderköping Municipality
- Södertälje Municipality
- Sölvesborg Municipality
- Tanum Municipality
- Tibro Municipality
- Tidaholm Municipality
- Tierp Municipality
- Timrå Municipality
- Tingsryd Municipality
- Tjörn Municipality
- Tomelilla Municipality
- Torsby Municipality
- Torsås Municipality
- Tranemo Municipality
- Tranås Municipality
- Trelleborg Municipality
- Trollhättan Municipality
- Trosa Municipality
- Tyresö Municipality
- Täby Municipality
- Töreboda Municipality
- Uddevalla Municipality
- Ulricehamn Municipality
- Umeå Municipality
- Upplands-Bro Municipality
- Upplands Väsby Municipality
- Uppsala Municipality
- Uppvidinge Municipality
- Vadstena Municipality
- Vaggeryd Municipality
- Valdemarsvik Municipality
- Vallentuna Municipality
- Vansbro Municipality
- Vara Municipality
- Varberg Municipality
- Vaxholm Municipality
- Vellinge Municipality
- Vetlanda Municipality
- Vilhelmina Municipality
- Vimmerby Municipality
- Vindeln Municipality
- Vingåker Municipality
- Vårgårda Municipality
- Vänersborg Municipality
- Vännäs Municipality
- Värmdö Municipality
- Värnamo Municipality
- Västervik Municipality
- Västerås Municipality
- Växjö Municipality
- Ydre Municipality
- Ystad Municipality
- Åmål Municipality
- Ånge Municipality
- Åre Municipality
- Årjäng Municipality
- Åsele Municipality
- Åstorp Municipality
- Åtvidaberg Municipality
- Älmhult Municipality
- Älvdalen Municipality
- Älvkarleby Municipality
- Älvsbyn Municipality
- Ängelholm Municipality
- Öckerö Municipality
- Ödeshög Municipality
- Örebro Municipality
- Örkelljunga Municipality
- Örnsköldsvik Municipality
- Östersund Municipality
- Österåker Municipality
- Östhammar Municipality
- Östra Göinge Municipality
- Överkalix Municipality
- Övertorneå Municipality

===== Provinces of Sweden =====
Provinces of Sweden The provinces of Sweden, which are primarily historical in significance, are:

- Blekinge
- Bohuslän
- Dalarna (Dalecarlia*)
- Dalsland
- Gotland (Gotlandia*)
- Gästrikland
- Halland
- Hälsingland
- Härjedalen
- Jämtland
- Lappland
- Medelpad
- Norrbotten
- Närke (Nerike*)
- Skåne (Scania*)
- Småland
- Södermanland
- Uppland
- Värmland
- Västmanland
- Västerbotten
- Västergötland
- Ångermanland
- Öland
- Östergötland

=== Demography of Sweden ===
Demographics of Sweden

- Census of Sweden
- Demographical center of Sweden

== Government and politics of Sweden ==
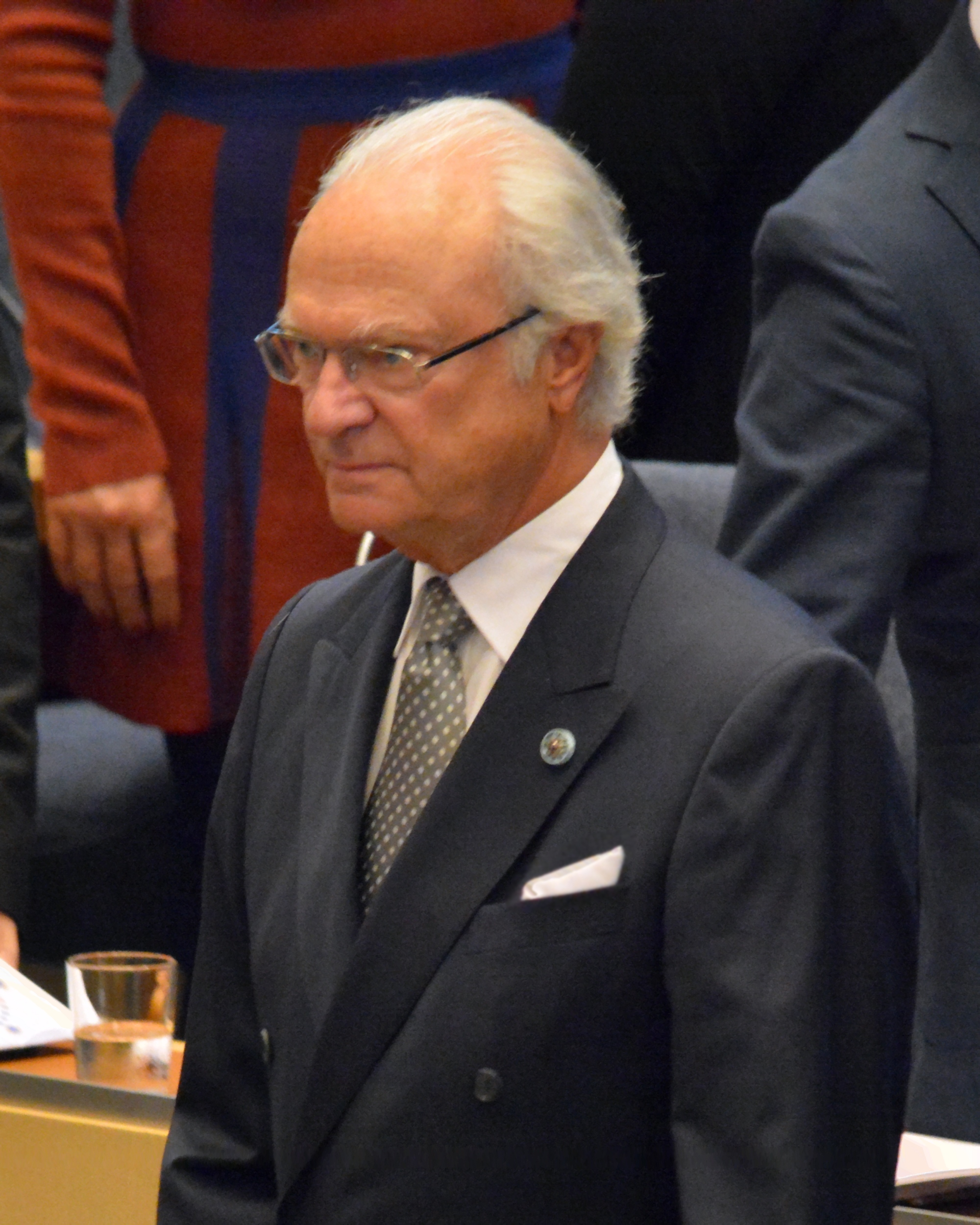
King Carl XVI Gustaf

Politics of Sweden

- Form of government: Constitutional monarchy
- Capital of Sweden: Stockholm
- Arctic policy of Sweden
- Anarchism in Sweden
- Consolidation of Sweden
- Corruption in Sweden
- Elections in Sweden
  - Election Authority of Sweden
  - Category:Elections in Sweden
- Monetary policy of Sweden
- Political parties in Sweden
- Taxation in Sweden
- Terrorism in Sweden

=== Branches of the State ===
- Head of state: King of Sweden, Carl XVI Gustaf

==== Executive branch ====
- Head of government: Prime Minister of Sweden
  - Deputy Prime Minister of Sweden
  - Government of Sweden
    - Government Agencies in Sweden

==== Legislative branch ====
- Riksdag of Sweden (unicameral)
  - Speaker of the Riksdag
  - Members of the Riksdag
- Parliamentary committees
  - Committee on Civil Affairs (Parliament of Sweden)
  - Committee on Finance (parliament of Sweden)
  - Committee on Foreign Affairs (parliament of Sweden)
  - Committee on Justice (parliament of Sweden)
  - Committee on the Constitution (Parliament of Sweden)

==== Judicial branch ====
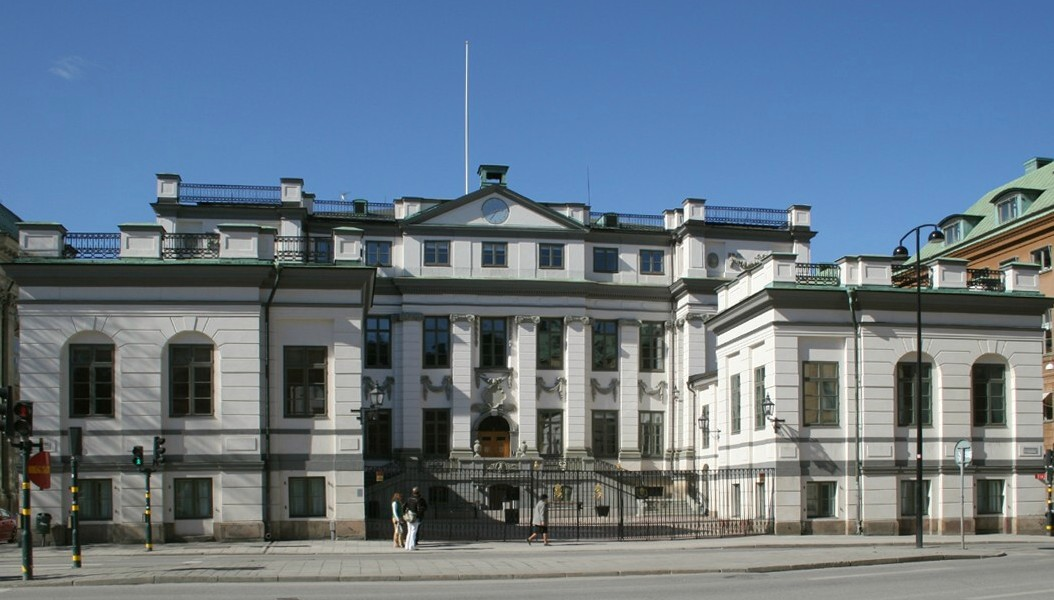
The Bonde Palace in Stockholm houses the Supreme Court of Sweden

Judicial system of Sweden

- Supreme Court of Sweden
- Supreme Administrative Court of Sweden

=== Foreign relations of Sweden ===
Foreign relations of Sweden

- Diplomatic missions in Sweden
- Diplomatic missions of Sweden
  - Embassy of Sweden in Moscow
  - Embassy of Sweden, Athens
  - Embassy of Sweden, Bangkok
  - Embassy of Sweden, Helsinki
  - Embassy of Sweden, London
    - List of ambassadors of Sweden to the United Kingdom
  - Embassy of Sweden, Mexico City
  - Embassy of Sweden, Paris
  - Embassy of Sweden, Prague
  - Embassy of Sweden, Rome
  - List of ambassadors of Sweden to Germany
  - List of ambassadors of Sweden to Ukraine
  - List of ambassadors of Sweden to the United States

==== International organization membership ====
The Kingdom of Sweden is a member of:

- African Development Bank Group (AfDB) (nonregional member)
- Arctic Council
- Asian Development Bank (ADB) (nonregional member)
- Australia Group
- Bank for International Settlements (BIS)
- Confederation of European Paper Industries (CEPI)
- Council of Europe (CE)
- Council of the Baltic Sea States (CBSS)
- Euro-Atlantic Partnership Council (EAPC)
- European Bank for Reconstruction and Development (EBRD)
- European Investment Bank (EIB)
- European Organization for Nuclear Research (CERN)
- European Space Agency (ESA)
- European Union (EU)
- Food and Agriculture Organization (FAO)
- Group of 9 (G9)
- Group of Ten (G10)
- Inter-American Development Bank (IADB)
- International Atomic Energy Agency (IAEA)
- International Bank for Reconstruction and Development (IBRD)
- International Chamber of Commerce (ICC)
- International Civil Aviation Organization (ICAO)
- International Criminal Court (ICCt)
- International Criminal Police Organization (Interpol)
- International Development Association (IDA)
- International Energy Agency (IEA)
- International Federation of Red Cross and Red Crescent Societies (IFRCS)
- International Finance Corporation (IFC)
- International Fund for Agricultural Development (IFAD)
- International Hydrographic Organization (IHO)
- International Labour Organization (ILO)
- International Maritime Organization (IMO)
- International Mobile Satellite Organization (IMSO)
- International Monetary Fund (IMF)
- International Olympic Committee (IOC)
- International Organization for Migration (IOM)
- International Organization for Standardization (ISO)
- International Red Cross and Red Crescent Movement (ICRM)
- International Telecommunication Union (ITU)
- International Telecommunications Satellite Organization (ITSO)
- International Trade Union Confederation (ITUC)
- Inter-Parliamentary Union (IPU)
- Multilateral Investment Guarantee Agency (MIGA)
- Nordic Council (NC)
- Nordic Investment Bank (NIB)
- North Atlantic Treaty Organization (NATO)
- Nuclear Energy Agency (NEA)
- Nuclear Suppliers Group (NSG)
- Organisation for Economic Co-operation and Development (OECD)
- Organization for Security and Cooperation in Europe (OSCE)
- Organisation for the Prohibition of Chemical Weapons (OPCW)
- Organization of American States (OAS) (observer)
- Paris Club
- Partnership for Peace (PFP)
- Permanent Court of Arbitration (PCA)
- Schengen Convention
- United Nations (UN)
- United Nations Conference on Trade and Development (UNCTAD)
- United Nations Educational, Scientific, and Cultural Organization (UNESCO)
- United Nations High Commissioner for Refugees (UNHCR)
- United Nations Industrial Development Organization (UNIDO)
- United Nations Military Observer Group in India and Pakistan (UNMOGIP)
- United Nations Mission in Liberia (UNMIL)
- United Nations Mission in the Central African Republic and Chad (MINURCAT)
- United Nations Mission in the Sudan (UNMIS)
- United Nations Observer Mission in Georgia (UNOMIG)
- United Nations Organization Mission in the Democratic Republic of the Congo (MONUC)
- United Nations Relief and Works Agency for Palestine Refugees in the Near East (UNRWA)
- United Nations Truce Supervision Organization (UNTSO)
- Universal Postal Union (UPU)
- Western European Union (WEU) (observer)
- World Customs Organization (WCO)
- World Federation of Trade Unions (WFTU)
- World Health Organization (WHO)
- World Intellectual Property Organization (WIPO)
- World Meteorological Organization (WMO)
- World Trade Organization (WTO)
- World Veterans Federation
- Zangger Committee (ZC)

=== Law and order in Sweden ===
Law of Sweden

- Constitution of Sweden
- Divorce law in Sweden
- Human rights in Sweden
  - Abortion in Sweden
  - Censorship in Sweden
  - Compulsory sterilisation in Sweden
  - LGBT rights in Sweden
  - Same-sex marriage in Sweden
  - Freedom of religion in Sweden
- Law enforcement in Sweden
  - Crime in Sweden
    - Human trafficking in Sweden
    - Racism in Sweden
      - Antisemitism in Sweden
    - Terrorism in Sweden
  - Capital punishment in Sweden
  - Life imprisonment in Sweden

=== Military of Sweden ===
Military of Sweden

- Command
  - Commander-in-chief: Government of Sweden (Prime Minister, Minister for Defence)
    - Supreme Commander of the Swedish Armed Forces
  - Ministry of Defence of Sweden
- Forces
  - Swedish Armed Forces
    - Swedish Army
      - Swedish Home Guard
    - Swedish Navy
      - Swedish Amphibious Corps
      - Swedish Fleet
    - Swedish Air Force
      - Military aircraft of Sweden
  - Special forces of Sweden
- Military equipment of Sweden
- Military history of Sweden
- Military ranks of Sweden
- Soldier ranks of Sweden

=== Local government in Sweden ===
Local government in Sweden

- County Administrative Boards of Sweden
- County councils of Sweden
- Municipalities of Sweden

== History of Sweden ==
History of Sweden

- Timeline of Swedish history

=== History of Sweden, by period ===
- History of Sweden (800–1521)
- History of Sweden (1523–1611)
- History of Sweden (1611–48)
- History of Sweden (1772–1809)
- History of Sweden (1945–67)
- History of Sweden (1967–91)
- History of Sweden (1991–present)

=== History of Sweden, by subject ===
- Economic history of Sweden
- History of the Internet in Sweden
- History of the Jews in Sweden
- History of rail transport in Sweden
- Military history of Sweden

== Culture of Sweden ==
Culture of Sweden

- Architecture of Sweden
  - Historic buildings in Sweden
    - Crown palaces in Sweden
    - Castles and manor houses in Sweden
    - Cathedrals in Sweden
- Cuisine of Sweden
  - Alcoholic beverages in Sweden
    - Beer in Sweden
    - Beer classification in Sweden and Finland
- Festivals in Sweden
- Linguistics of Sweden
  - Date and time notation in Sweden
  - Languages of Sweden
- Media in Sweden
- Museums in Sweden
- National symbols of Sweden
  - Coat of arms of Sweden
  - Flag of Sweden
  - National anthem of Sweden
- Prostitution in Sweden
- Public holidays in Sweden
- Records of Sweden
- Scouting and Guiding in Sweden
- World Heritage Sites in Sweden

=== Art in Sweden ===
- Art in Sweden
- Cinema of Sweden
- Literature of Sweden
- Music of Sweden
- Television in Sweden
- Theatre in Sweden

=== People of Sweden ===
People of Sweden

- Ethnic minorities in Sweden
  - Albanians in Sweden
  - Arabs in Sweden
  - Armenians in Sweden
  - Assyrians in Sweden
  - Croats of Sweden
  - Ethnic Macedonians in Sweden
  - Sweden Finns
  - Kurds in Sweden
  - Lebanese people in Sweden
  - Pakistanis in Sweden
  - Russians in Sweden
  - Somalis in Sweden
  - Turks in Sweden
  - Uruguayans in Sweden

=== Religion in Sweden ===
Religion in Sweden

- Buddhism in Sweden
- Christianity in Sweden
  - Baptist Union of Sweden
  - Church of Sweden
    - Church of Sweden Abroad
    - Archdiocese of Uppsala
  - Evangelical Free Church in Sweden
  - Evangelical Lutheran Church in Sweden
  - Evangelical Reformed Church in Sweden
  - Roman Catholicism in Sweden
- Hinduism in Sweden
- Islam in Sweden
  - Ahmadiyya in Sweden
- Judaism in Sweden
- Sikhism in Sweden

=== Sports in Sweden ===
Sports in Sweden

- Football in Sweden
  - Australian rules football in Sweden
  - Football derbies in Sweden
  - Football records in Sweden
  - Women's football in Sweden
- Sweden at the Olympics
- Rugby league in Sweden
- Rugby union in Sweden
- Speedway in Sweden
  - Speedway Grand Prix of Sweden
  - 1995 Speedway Grand Prix of Sweden
  - 1996 Speedway Grand Prix of Sweden
  - 1997 Speedway Grand Prix of Sweden
  - 1998 Speedway Grand Prix of Sweden
  - 1999 Speedway Grand Prix of Sweden
  - 2000 Speedway Grand Prix of Sweden
  - 2007 Speedway Grand Prix of Sweden
  - 2008 Speedway Grand Prix of Sweden
  - 2009 Speedway Grand Prix of Sweden
  - 2010 Speedway Grand Prix of Sweden
  - 2011 Speedway Grand Prix of Sweden
  - 2012 Speedway Grand Prix of Sweden
  - Strength athletics in Sweden
  - Women's ice hockey in Sweden
  - Swimming in Sweden

== Economy and infrastructure of Sweden ==
Economy of Sweden

- Economic rank, by nominal GDP (2007): 18th (eighteenth)
- Agriculture in Sweden
- Automotive industry in Sweden
- Banking in Sweden
  - Monetary policy of Sweden
  - Banks in Sweden
    - Swedish National Bank
  - Student loans in Sweden
- Communications in Sweden
  - Telecommunications in Sweden
    - Telephone numbers in Sweden
    - Television in Sweden
      - Digital terrestrial television in Sweden
        - List of television stations in Sweden
        - Television licensing in Sweden
    - Internet in Sweden
      - History of the Internet in Sweden
- Companies of Sweden
- Currency of Sweden: Krona
  - ISO 4217: SEK
- Economic history of Sweden
- Energy in Sweden
  - Biofuel in Sweden
  - Electricity sector in Sweden
    - Power stations in Sweden
    - Nuclear power in Sweden
    - Wind power in Sweden
      - Offshore wind farms in Sweden
  - Energy policy of Sweden
  - Oil industry in Sweden
- Health in Sweden
  - Health care in Sweden
  - Obesity in Sweden
  - Smoking in Sweden
  - Suicide in Sweden
- Mining in Sweden
- Sweden Stock Exchange
- Tourism in Sweden
- Transport in Sweden
  - Air transport in Sweden
    - List of airlines of Sweden
    - Airports in Sweden
  - Automotive industry in Sweden
  - Rail transport in Sweden
    - Railway stations in Sweden
    - High-speed rail in Sweden
    - List of town tramway systems in Sweden
  - Road system in Sweden
    - Bridges in Sweden
    - Roads in Sweden
      - List of motorways in Sweden
    - Road signs in Sweden
    - Tunnels in Sweden
- Student loans in Sweden
- Unemployment benefits in Sweden
  - Unemployment funds in Sweden
- Water supply and sanitation in Sweden
- Welfare in Sweden

== Education in Sweden ==
Education in Sweden

- Academic grading in Sweden
- Academic rank in Sweden
- Student loans in Sweden

== See also ==
Sweden

- Index of Sweden-related articles
- List of international rankings
- List of Sweden-related topics
- Member state of the European Union
- Member state of the United Nations
- Outline of Europe
- Outline of geography
- Royal Court of Sweden
- Agriculture in Sweden
