= Norwegian rigsdaler =

Former Norwegian currency

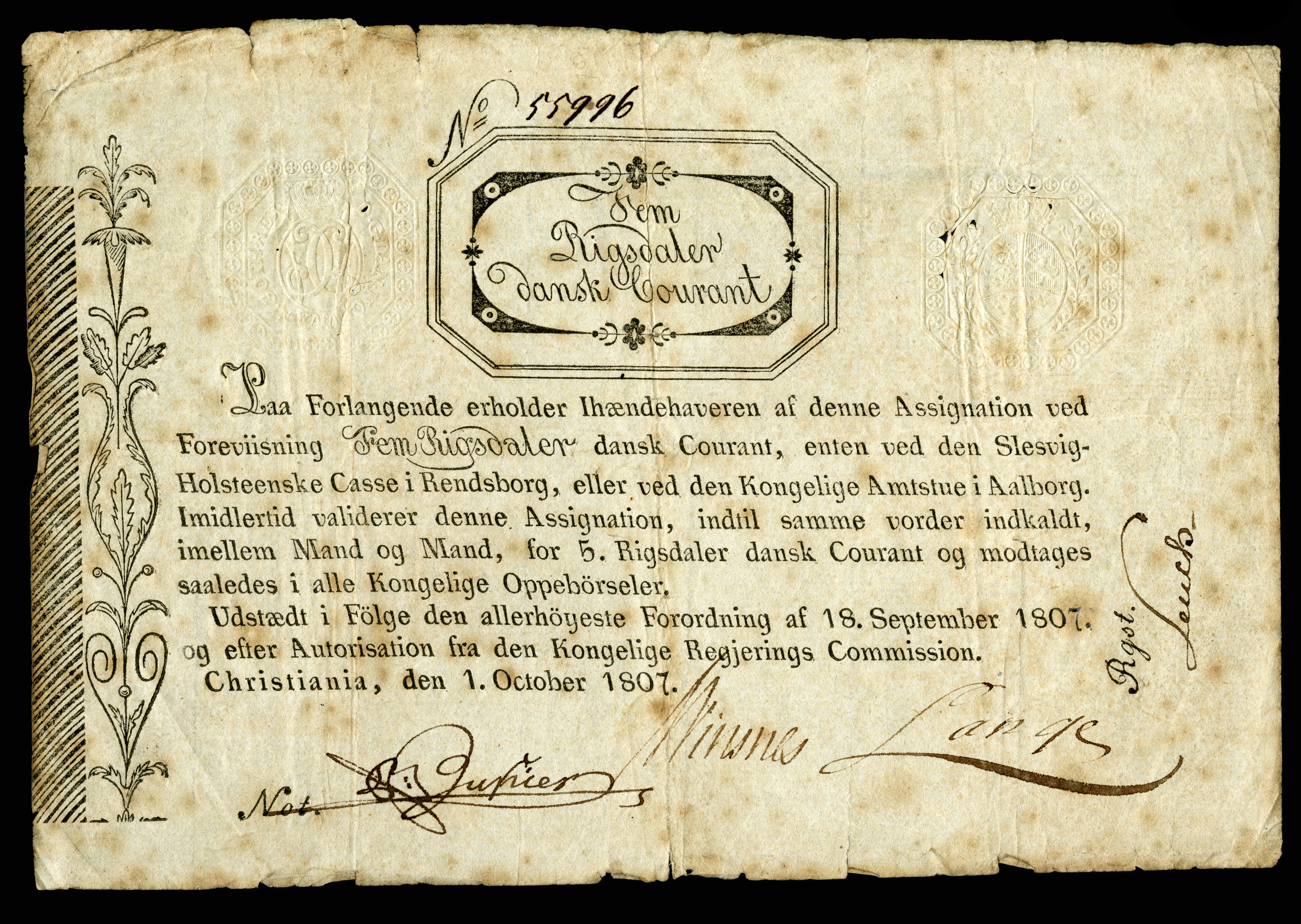
Five Rigsdaler Courant (1807), first year paper currency was re-introduced to Norway.

The rigsdaler specie was a unit of silver currency used in Norway from 1544, renamed as the speciedaler in 1816 and used until 1873. Norway used a common reichsthaler currency system shared with Denmark, Hamburg and Schleswig-Holstein until 1873 when the gold standard was implemented in Scandinavia and the German Empire.

== Rigsdaler specie ==
The reichsthaler currency system used in Northern Europe until 1873 consisted of the silver Reichsthaler specie (Rigsdaler specie) worth 120 skillings in Norway and Denmark, and the lower-valued Rigsdaler courant worth 4/5th of specie or 96 skillings (both units worth 60 and 48 schellingen, respectively, in Hamburg and Schleswig-Holstein). The Hamburg Bank equated 9 1/4 reichsthalers specie to a Cologne Mark of fine silver, hence 25.28 g silver in a rigsdaler specie.

=== Coins ===
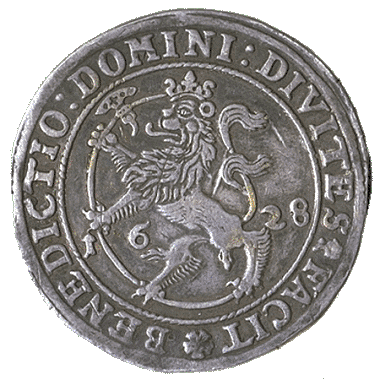
A 1628 rigsdaler with the lion of the Norwegian Coat of Arms on the reverse, the obverse showing Christian IV.

In the late 18th and early 19th centuries, coins were issued in denominations of 1, 2, 4, 8 and 24 skilling, 1/15, 1/5, 1/3, 1/2, 2/3 and 1 rigsdaler specie.

=== Banknotes ===
In 1695, government notes were issued for 10, 20, 25, 50 and 100 rigsdaler (spelt rixdaler). In 1807, notes were reintroduced by the government, in denominations of 1, 5, 10 and 100 rigsdaler courant, with 12 skilling notes added in 1810. In 1813, Rigsbankens Norske Avdeling began issuing notes. in denominations of 1, 5, 50, and 100 Rigsbankdaler. Subsequent series were issued by Norges Midlertidige Rigsbank (1814), Stattholderbevis (1815), and Norges Bank (1817–22 to the present).

== Norwegian speciedaler ==
After the Napoleonic Wars Denmark dropped out of the system described above in favor of a lower-valued Danish rigsdaler. However Norway retained the system even after its union with Sweden, renaming the specie coin as the Speciedaler but still divided into 120 skillings.

It was replaced by the Norwegian krone when Norway joined the Scandinavian Monetary Union. An equal valued krone/krona of the monetary union replaced the three currencies at the rate of 1 krone/krona = 1/2 Danish rigsdaler = 1/4 Norwegian speciedaler = 1 Swedish riksdaler.

=== Coins ===
In 1816, coins in circulation from the previous currency remained in circulation, with only 1 skilling coins being minted. A new coinage was introduced in 1819, consisting of copper 1 and 2 skilling and silver 8 and 24 skilling, 1/2 and 1 specidaler. Silver 2 and 4 skilling coins were introduced in 1825, followed by copper 1/2 skilling pieces in 1839, silver 12 skilling in 1845 and silver 3 skilling in 1868. It was made out of Iron.

=== Banknotes ===
Norges Bank began issuing notes in 1817, with denominations of 24 skilling, 1/2, 1, 5, 10, 50 and 100 speciedaler.
