= Scandinavian Monetary Union =

Monetary union formed by Sweden and Denmark on May 5, 1873

Den Skandinaviske Møntunion (Danish); Den skandinaviske myntunionen (Nynorsk); Skandinaviska myntunionen (Swedish)
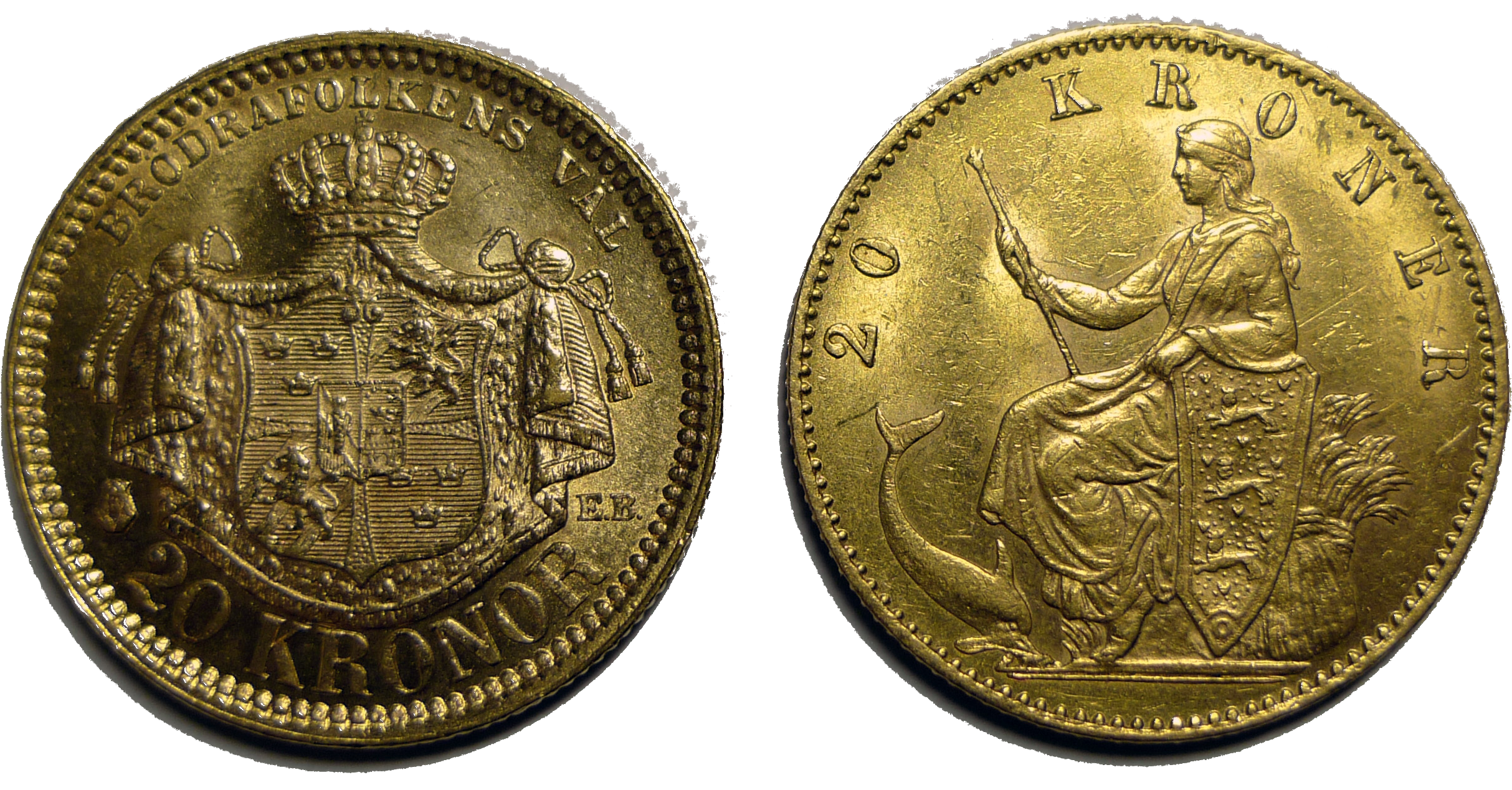
- Two golden 20 kr coins, with identical weight and composition. The coin to the left is Swedish and the right one is Danish.

Units of account
- Base unit: krone/krona
- Plural: kroner/kronor
- Symbol: kr.
- Subunit
- 1/100: øre/öre
- Plural
- øre/öre: øre/öre (singular and plural)

Denominations
- Coins: 1, 2, 5, 10, 25, 40, 50 øre 1, 2, 5, 10, 25 kroner

Demographics
- User(s): Denmark; Sweden; Norway

Issuance
- Central bank: Danmarks Nationalbank, Skandinaviska Banken, Norges Bank, Sveriges Riksbank

Valuation
- Pegged with: Gold standard
- This infobox shows the latest status before this currency was rendered obsolete.

The Scandinavian Monetary Union was a monetary union formed by Denmark and Sweden on 5 May 1873, with Norway joining in 1875. It established a common currency unit, the krone/krona, based on the gold standard. It was one of the few tangible results of the Scandinavian political movement of the 19th century. The union ended during World War I.

== Overview ==
The original Scandinavian currencies were based on the silver Reichsthaler, defined by the Hamburger Bank as 25.28 grams fine silver, which was equal to one Norwegian speciedaler or two Danish rigsdaler. Sweden's riksdaler specie was slightly heavier at 25.5 g and was equal to four Swedish riksdaler riksgälds.

The Scandinavian switch to the gold standard was triggered by Germany's adoption of the German gold mark in 1873 and of the consequent disturbance in the silver market. The monetary union established the gold krone (krona in Swedish) replacing the legacy currencies at the rate of 1 krone = 1 Swedish riksdaler = 1/2 Danish rigsdaler = 1/4 Norwegian speciedaler = 1/4 Hamburg reichsthaler. The latter's conversion to 4.50 German gold marks (hence, 1 krone = 1.125 marks) established the gold parity of the krone: one gram of fine gold worth 2.79 marks was equivalent to 2.48 krone (or 0.4032 g gold per krone).

The British pound (the "world currency" of the time) was equal to 18.16 kroner, and the franc of France and the Latin Monetary Union was worth 0.72 krone. Sweden's long-established tradition of using paper currency eased the implementation of a Gold Exchange Standard wherein gold coins rarely circulated but the respective central banks (the Sveriges Riksbank, Danmarks Nationalbank and Norges Bank) centralized their respective gold reserves and guaranteed the conversion of krone banknotes to gold for export purposes.

The union provided fixed exchange rates and stability in monetary terms, but the member countries continued to issue their own separate currencies. Although not initially foreseen, the perceived security led to a situation where the formally separate currencies were accepted on a basis of "as good as" the legal tender virtually throughout the entire area.

Upon acceding to the union, Sweden had the name of its currency changed from Riksdaler Riksmynt to Swedish krona. The word "krone/krona" literally means "crown", and the differences in spelling of the name represent the differences between the North Germanic languages.

The political union between Sweden and Norway was dissolved in 1905, but this did not affect the basis for co-operation in the monetary union.

All three countries still use the same currencies as during the monetary union, but they lost their peg, one to one, in 1914. The Icelandic króna is a derivative of the Danish krone, established after Iceland was elevated to a separate kingdom in union with Denmark in 1918. Iceland cut its ties to Denmark in 1944 and became a republic. The Icelandic króna soon became volatile, causing a high inflation and in 1980 a currency reform was introduced, in which 1 new Icelandic króna was set to 100 original ones.

The Scandinavian Monetary Union was inspired by the Latin Monetary Union, established in 1865. As Scandinavia became industrialized, a call for a firm monetary system had risen in the 1860s. The idea of using a foreign currency was discussed, but as the old dividing of the British Pound was similar to what Scandinavia wished to get rid of, the French defeat in the Franco-Prussian War made the French Franc less attractive and as the German Mark was out of the question in Denmark after the 1864 Second Schleswig War, the idea of a Scandinavian Monetary system based on the Gold standard was imposed 1873 to 1875. The union was dissolved gradually from the outbreak of World War One until 1924, when the union formally was dissolved. Nevertheless, the 1:1:1 banknote rate continued at least until the economical crisis in the early 1930s.

Whether the Scandinavian Monetary Union was a success has been a subject of discussion. Some experts observe it functioned best between 1901 and 1905, at which point it was a complete system of coin, banknotes and common drawing rights available to the central banks. Although it was effective in its own limited monetary terms, the Union was only of minor importance in the total foreign relations of the member countries. Moreover, the trade between the member countries composed only a small part of their total trade, a share that was in decline during the lifetime of the Union. The monetary union was never accompanied by a tariff union, a fact that stresses its partial nature: it never formed a vital part of these countries' international economic relations. Other experts take a more positive view, arguing that no other politically independent countries went equally far in their monetary integration. From an international perspective, it was the most successful of all monetary unions during the time of the classic gold standard.

== See also ==
=== Economics ===
- Economy of Denmark
- Economy of Norway
- Economy of Sweden
- Monetary policy of Sweden

=== Banks ===
- Danmarks Nationalbank
- Norges Bank
- Skandinaviska Banken
- Sveriges Riksbank

=== Currencies before the union ===
- Danish rigsdaler
- Norwegian rigsdaler
- Norwegian speciedaler
- Swedish riksdaler

=== Currencies during and after the union ===
- Danish krone
- Norwegian krone
- Swedish krona
