= Monetary policy of Sweden =

The monetary policy of Sweden is decided by Sveriges Riksbank, the central bank of Sweden. The monetary policy is instrumental in determining how the Swedish currency is valued.

== History ==
The main events in the monetary history of the Krona are:

- Introduction of the Krona, based on the gold standard on 5 May 1873. (1 kg of gold = 2480 Kronor)
- The tie to gold is abolished on 2 August 1914.
- The tie to gold is de facto re-established in November 1922.
- The tie to gold is de jure re-established on 1 April 1924
- The tie to gold is abolished once more on 27 September 1931. Floating exchange rate.
- A tie to the British pound is introduced in June 1933. (1 GBP = 19.40 SEK)
- Tied to the US dollar on 28 August 1939. (1 USD = 4.20 SEK)
- A controlled appreciation of 14.3%, against all other currencies and gold on 13 July 1946. (1 USD = 3.60 SEK)
- A controlled depreciation of 30.5% against the USD on 19 September 1949. (1 USD = 5.17 SEK)
- Membership of the International Monetary Fund and part of the Bretton Woods system on 31 August 1951.
- A controlled depreciation of 1.0% against gold and a 7.5% appreciation against the USD on 21 December 1971.
- A controlled depreciation of 5.0% against gold and a 5.6% appreciation against the USD on 16 February 1973.
- Membership in the European "currency snake" in March 1973.
- Adjustment of the exchange rates within the "snake"; a controlled 3% depreciation against the DEM on 18 October 1976.
- Adjustment of the exchange rates within the "snake"; a controlled 6% depreciation against the DEM on 4 April 1977.
- Sweden leaves the "snake". A controlled 10% depreciation against a trade based "currency basket" on 29 August 1977.
- A controlled depreciation of 10% against the "currency basket" on 14 September 1981.
- A controlled depreciation of 16% against the "currency basket" on 8 October 1982.
- A tie to the European Currency Unit is introduced unilaterally on 17 May 1991. (1 ECU = 7.40 SEK)
- Floating exchange rate on 19 November 1992.
- A Swedish euro referendum is held on 2003, with 55.9 percent vote against membership of the eurozone.

== 1992 ==
In late 1992 (Monday 14 September) the British pound began a steep decline that made it "leave" the Exchange Rate Mechanism on the Wednesday of that week. At the same time the Swedish currency began to decline; the first reaction from the central bank was to try to keep the current fixed exchange rates in place, and they set a target for their equivalent to the federal funds rate ("marginal rate") at 500%. The bank began to sell short-term government securities in large amounts but soon realized that market forces were strong, so they lowered their target rate, and let everyone sell what they wanted to sell, and the country saw a large selling of SEK, and SEK denominated papers. Between September 1992 and February 1993 the Swedish currency "TCW" index went from 125 to 100 (20% fall), while the British currency XBP index fell from 200 to 142 (29% fall).

== See also ==
- Scandinavian Monetary Union
- Economy of Sweden
- History of copper currency in Sweden
