= Smoking in Sweden =

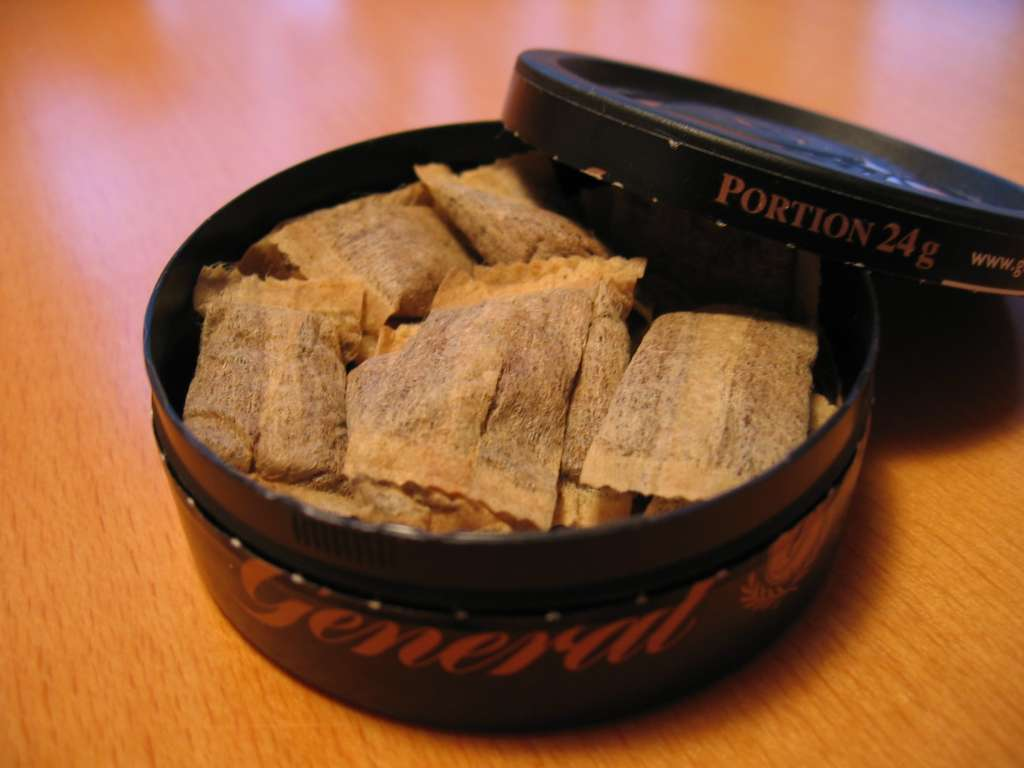
Portioned snus of the Swedish label General

Smoking in Sweden is at a very low prevalence; only 5.4% of the Swedish population (age 16-84) smoked daily in 2024. The prevalence among women has been higher for many years. Since 2018, the difference between the two genders has remained within 1% each year. Around 6% smoke occasionally.

In 2023, Sweden had the lowest smoking prevalence in the European Union, at 8% among people aged 15 and over, compared with an EU average of 24%. The corresponding figures for Sweden were 9% for men and 8% for women.

In 2024, daily smoking was lowest among people aged 16-29, at 2%, and highest among those aged 65-84, at 7%. In the same Public Health Agency of Sweden survey, daily nicotine pouch use among people aged 16-29 increased from 10% to 15% among women and from 5% to 11% among men between 2022 and 2024.

According to the 2025 national school survey, 7% of ninth-grade students and 19% of upper-secondary students reported smoking. In the 2021/2022 Health Behaviour in School-aged Children survey, 26% of 15-year-old girls and 21% of 15-year-old boys had tried smoking cigarettes, while 27% and 31%, respectively, had used snus.

Sweden was the only European country to achieve the WHO goal of less than 20% daily smoking prevalence among adults by year 2000. Sweden has a high level of use of smokeless tobacco, specifically a moist snuff product called 'snus', which some Swedes have used as a replacement for smoking. The Swedish Council for Information on Alcohol and Other Drugs reported in 2023 that cigarette use in Sweden was at a historically low level, while use of new tobacco-free nicotine products such as all-white snus and vapes had increased during the previous ten years. The same summary stated that all-white snus use was three times more common among young adults aged 17-29 than in other age groups, whereas daily smoking was more common in older age groups.

A 2025 Nordic Welfare Centre overview presented 2024 Swedish data showing 12.1% cigarette smoking and 26.8% oral nicotine product use among people aged 16-29. The same overview concluded that, across the Nordic and Baltic countries, youth cigarette smoking continued to decline except in Latvia and Norway, while oral nicotine product use increased across most countries from 2018 to 2024.

== Legislation ==
Smoking has been banned in all bars and restaurants since May 2005. A majority of Swedes supported the introduction of the ban. In 2019 the ban was extended to also include outdoor seating in bars and restaurants as well as public places such as playgrounds, bus stops and train stations. The legislation also covered electronic cigarettes and refill containers, herbal smoking products, and other products used in a similar manner, with signage required at affected venues.

== See also ==
- European Tobacco Products Directive

== Bibliography ==
- Lisa Ermann; Lisa Klefbom (10 December 2024). "Swedish tobacco policy: key learnings to decrease smoking and challenges that still lie ahead". Tobacco Prevention & Cessation. 10: 1–3. doi:10.18332/tpc/196350. PMC 11659985. PMID 39711980.
