= Obesity in Sweden =

Health issue in Sweden

Share of adults that are obese, 1975 to 2016

Obesity in Sweden has been increasingly cited as a major health issue in recent years. Sweden is the 90th fattest country in the world. In 2009, the number of people who are considered overweight or obese had not increased for the first time in 70 years. Claude Marcus, a leading Swedish nutrition expert from the Karolinska Institutet, stated that one solution is to introduce a fat tax. Folksam refused to insure a 5-year-old girl from Orust. The insurance company refused her insurance based on "serious overweight/obesity". A report showed that children whose parents were better educated had a lower chance of becoming overweight.

== Cause ==
Lack of exercise along with sugar-sweetened foods and drinks have caused one out of six five-year-olds in Sweden to be overweight or obese. The breakdown is 12.9% of children are considered overweight and 4.3% are considered obese. These figures were derived from the All Babies in Southeast Sweden (ABIS) cohort, which followed children born between 1997 and 1999 and examined their growth and dietary habits. The research also found associations between childhood weight and factors including physical activity, diet and parental characteristics.

== Effects ==
Several studies in Sweden shown that obese men tend to have a lower sperm count, fewer rapidly mobile sperm and fewer progressively motile sperm compared to normal-weight men.

== Programs ==
School nurses in Uppsala, Uppsala County, will be prescribing exercise to teenage children. The prescribed exercise can be anything from participating in a sport to walking. Spaces will be available for the participants.

== Forbes ranking 2007 ==
Source: Forbes.com

Ranking	Country	Percentage Overweight
85	Panama	51.4
86	Tunisia	51.0
87	Saint Vincent and the Grenadines	50.6
88	Brazil	50.5
89	Belize	49.8
90	Sweden	49.7
91	Norway	49.1
92	Russia	49.1
93	El Salvador	48.7
94	Lesotho	48.5
95	Suriname	47.8

== See also ==
- Health in Sweden
- Epidemiology of obesity
