= Football records and statistics in Sweden =

This article lists various Swedish football records for the various Swedish football leagues and competitions and the Sweden national team.

== National team ==
=== Men's national team ===
Largest victory: 12–0

- vs. Latvia, 29 May 1927

Largest loss: 1–12

- vs. England Amateur, 20 October 1908

Most appearances, career: 148

- Anders Svensson (1999–2013)

Most appearances, consecutive: 45

- Orvar Bergmark (1956–62)

Most goals scored, career: 62

- Zlatan Ibrahimović (2001–16)

Most penalty goals scored, career: 7

- Bo Larsson (1964–74)

Most hat-tricks, career: 9

- Sven Rydell (1924–32)

Fastest goal: 11 seconds

- Hjalmar Lorichs vs. Finland, 27 June 1912

== Swedish Champions ==
Most championships: 22

- Malmö FF
  - 1943–44, 1948–49, 1949–50, 1950–51, 1952–53, 1965, 1967, 1970, 1971, 1974, 1975, 1977, 1986, 1988, 2004, 2010, 2013, 2014, 2016, 2017, 2020, 2021

Most championships, consecutive: 4

- Örgryte IS
  - 1896, 1897, 1898, 1899
  - 1904, 1905, 1906, 1907
- IFK Norrköping
  - 1944–45, 1945–46, 1946–47, 1947–48
- IFK Göteborg
  - 1993, 1994, 1995, 1996

== Allsvenskan ==
Most championships: 27

- Malmö FF
  - 1943–44, 1948–49, 1949–50, 1950–51, 1952–53, 1965, 1967, 1970, 1971, 1974, 1975, 1977, 1985, 1986, 1987, 1988, 1989, 2004, 2010, 2013, 2014, 2016, 2017, 2020, 2021, 2023, 2024

Most championships, consecutive: 5

- Malmö FF
  - 1985, 1986, 1987, 1988, 1989

Most wins, season: 23

- Mjällby AIF (2025)
  - Played 30, won 23, drew 6, lost 1

Fewest wins, season: 0

- Billingsfors IK
  - Played 22, won 0, drew 3, lost 19

Wins, consecutive: 23

- Malmö FF (1949–50)

Without losses, consecutive: 49

- Malmö FF (1949–50)
  - Played 49, won 41, drew 8

Losses, consecutive: 18

- GAIS (1959)

Without wins, consecutive: 22

- Billingsfors IK (1946–47)
  - Played 22, drew 3, lost 19

Most points, season (2 points for a win): 43

- Malmö FF (1974)
  - Played 26, won 19, drew 5, lost 2

Most points, season (3 points for a win): 75

- Mjällby AIF (2025)
  - Played 30, won 23, drew 6, lost 1

Fewest points, season (2 points for a win): 3

- Billingsfors IK (1946–47)
  - Played 22, won 0, drew 3, lost 19

Fewest points, season (3 points for a win): 10

- GIF Sundsvall (1991)
  - Played 18, won 1, drew 7, lost 10

Most appearances, career: 431

- Sven Andersson (Örgryte IS, Helsingborgs IF) (1981–2001)

Most appearances, consecutive: 332

- Sven Jonasson (IF Elfsborg) (1927–42)

Most goals scored, career: 252

- Sven Jonasson (IF Elfsborg) (1927–42)

Most goals scored, season: 39

- Filip Johansson (IFK Göteborg) (1924–25)

Most goals scored, match: 7

- Arne Hjertsson (Malmö FF) vs. Halmstads BK, 3 June 1943 (12–0)
- Gunnar Nordahl (IFK Norrköping) vs. Landskrona BoIS 12 November 1944 (9–1)

Highest attendance, match: 52,194

- IFK Göteborg vs. Örgryte IS, 3 June 1959

== Svenska Cupen ==
Most championships: 15

- Malmö FF
  - 1944, 1946, 1947, 1951, 1953, 1967, 1972–73, 1973–74, 1974–75, 1977–78, 1979–80, 1983–84, 1985–86, 1988–89, 2021–22

== Most successful clubs overall (1896 – present) ==
As of 14 May 2026

Club	Domestic Titles							European Titles			Overall titles
Club	Swedish Football Champions	Regular Seasons 1924–30 & 1982–92	Svenska Cupen	Svenska Fotbollpokalen	Svenska Serien	Svenska Supercupen	Total	UEFA Europa League	Intertoto Cup	Total	Overall titles
Malmö FF	24	5	16	-	-	2	47	-	-	-	47
IFK Göteborg	18	4	8	-	5	1	36	2	1	3	39
AIK	12	1	8	-	-	1	22	-	1	1	23
IFK Norrköping	13	1	6	-	-	1	21	-	-	-	21
Örgryte IS	12	2	1	2	4	-	21	-	-	-	21
Djurgårdens IF	12	-	5	-	-	-	17	-	-	-	17
Helsingborgs IF	5	2	5	-	-	2	14	-	-	-	14
IF Elfsborg	6	-	3	-	-	1	10	-	-	-	10
GAIS	4	2	1	-	1	-	8	-	-	-	8
Halmstads BK	4	-	1	-	-	-	5	-	-	-	5
Östers IF	4	-	1	-	-	-	5	-	-	-	5
BK Häcken	1	-	4	-	-	-	5	-	-	-	5
Kalmar FF	1	-	3	-	-	1	5	-	-	-	5
Åtvidabergs FF	2	-	2	-	-	-	4	-	-	-	4
Hammarby IF	1	-	1	-	-	-	2	-	1	1	3
Gefle IF	-	-	-	3	-	-	3	-	-	-	3
Örebro SK	-	-	-	-	-	-	0	-	2	2	2
Mjällby AIF	1	-	1	-	-	-	2	-	-	-	2
Trelleborgs FF	-	-	-	-	-	-	0	-	1	1	1
Brynäs IF	1	-	-	-	-	-	1	-	-	-	1
Fässbergs IF	1	-	-	-	-	-	1	-	-	-	1
Göteborgs IF	1	-	-	-	-	-	1	-	-	-	1
IFK Eskilstuna	1	-	-	-	-	-	1	-	-	-	1
IK Sleipner	1	-	-	-	-	-	1	-	-	-	1
Degerfors IF	-	-	1	-	-	-	1	-	-	-	1
Landskrona BoIS	-	-	1	-	-	-	1	-	-	-	1
Östersunds FK	-	-	1	-	-	-	1	-	-	-	1
Råå IF	-	-	1	-	-	-	1	-	-	-	1

== See also ==
- List of football clubs by competitive honours won
