= Health in Sweden =

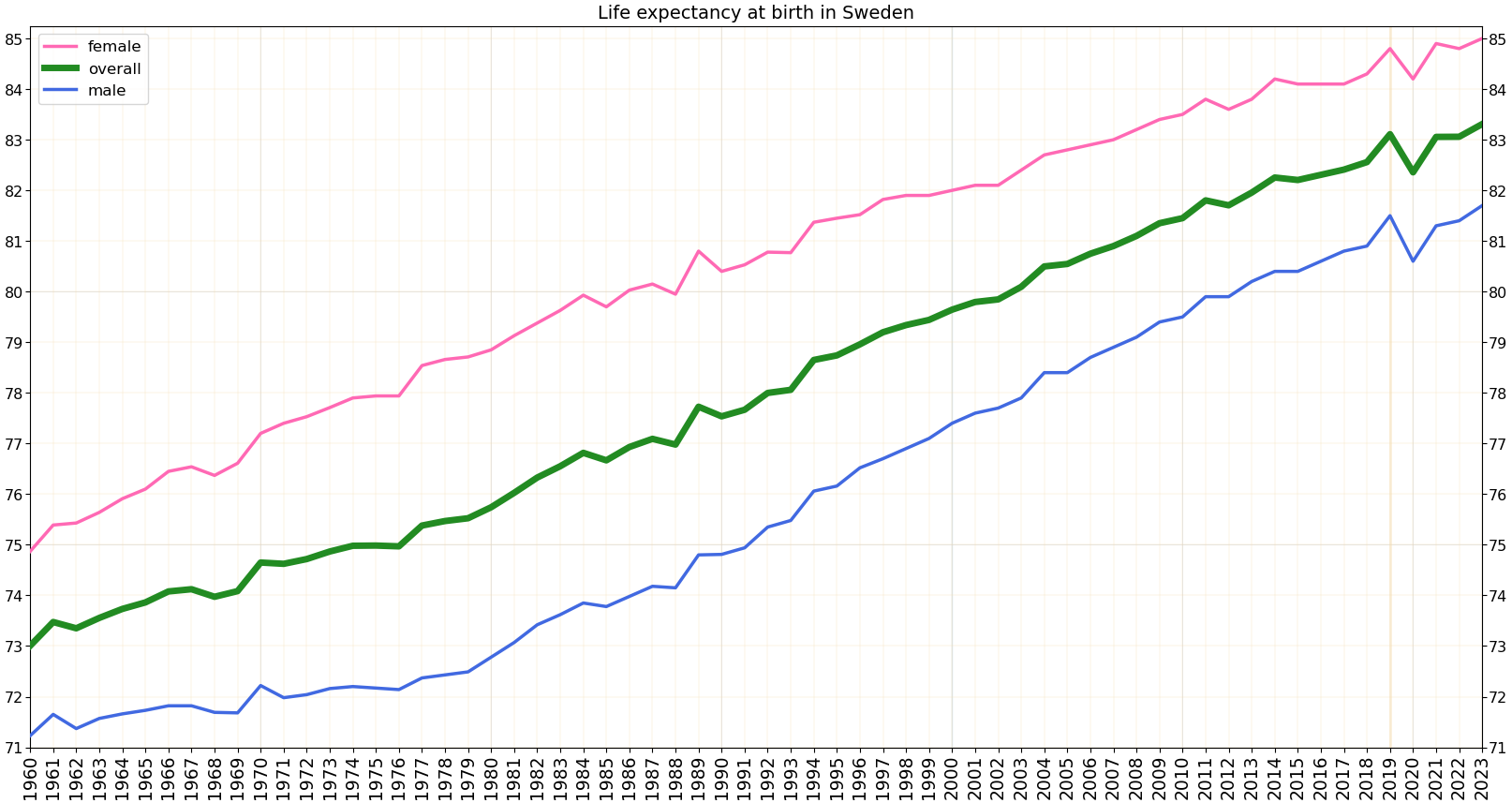
Life expectancy at birth in Sweden

Health in Sweden has generally improved over time, with life expectancy increasing, and is at a high level in international comparison. Life expectancy in 2021 was 84.8 years for women and 81.2 years for men and it increased 2.3 years on average from 2006 to 2019. However, the health situation varies between groups in Swedish society and equitable health has proven to be a challenge, with level of education, employment status and country of birth being factors that strongly influence health in the Swedish population. The two leading causes of death in Sweden are cardiovascular disease and cancer.

Infant mortality in Sweden was 2.1 per 1000 living births in 2020, down from 22 per 1000 in 1950.

== Health of specific groups in society ==
In self-assessments of health, young women indicate a higher level of stress and mild mental health issues compared to other age groups and compared to men. Women without upper secondary education have shown a slightly negative trend in life expectancy from 2006 to 2020.

The COVID-19 pandemic resulted in a decrease in life expectancy of 0.7 years in 2020 compared to 2019, with COVID-19 being the third most common cause of death in Sweden. Older persons, men, and persons born outside of Europe were some of the groups that were overrepresented among COVID-19 cases resulting in serious disease and death in Sweden.

=== Health of immigrants ===
Number of HIV healthcare patients in Sweden ages 0–85 male & female

According to the Public Health Agency of Sweden, cases of tuberculosis have increased steadily among immigrants from about 200 in 1989 to a peak of 750 in 2015, in 2016 the number of cases dropped as fewer migrants arrived. In the same period, the number of tuberculosis cases among Sweden-born dropped from 400 in 1989 to 50 in 2016.

From 2006 to 2016, the number of individuals applying for treatment for HIV increased from 1,684 to 6,273 (373%), which according to National Board of Health and Welfare was due to increased immigration from countries with higher levels of HIV.

According to the National Board of Health and Welfare in 2016, an estimated 20–30% of asylum seekers suffer from mental disorder.

Based on UNICEF rates for the practice of female genital mutilation (FGM) in various countries in Africa, the Swedish National Board of Health and Welfare (Socialstyrelsen) estimated in 2015 that around 38,000 foreign-born women living in Sweden may have been circumcised in their countries of origin. Socialstyrelsen indicated that there were no known instances of FGM procedures having been carried out while women resided in Sweden, and that although there may have been unreported cases, official figures for these were unavailable.

Immigrants in Sweden of non-European background report three to four times as often as Swedish natives that they suffer from poor or very poor health. This is particularly evident in regard to diminished work abilities and physical disabilities, but also in regard to anxiety and nervousness. However, the disparities between Swedish born and non-Swedish born residents' health were in part explained by the social differences across groups. These include occupation, living accommodation, and to have poorer economic resources than the average citizen. This suggests that the social living conditions play significant role in the health of immigrants in Sweden. Furthermore, poorer health can also likely be contributed to the fact that a decade is typically necessary for a refugee or immigrant to have the same living conditions of a native Swede. Finally, simply perceiving discrimination may also play a role in the high mental health illness rate among immigrants.

== International comparison ==
A new measure of expected human capital calculated for 195 countries from 1990 to 2016 and defined for each birth cohort as the expected years lived from age 20 to 64 years and adjusted for educational attainment, learning or education quality, and functional health status was published by The Lancet in September 2018. Sweden had the fifteenth highest level of expected human capital with 24 health, education, and learning-adjusted expected years lived between age 20 and 64 years.

== Organisations ==
The Public Health Agency of Sweden (Folkhälsomyndigheten) is the government agency responsible for public health including infectious disease, while health care and social services is under the responsibility of Swedish National Board of Health and Welfare (Socialstyrelsen). At the regional level, the 21 regions (formerly county councils) are responsible for financing and providing health care. At the local level, the 290 municipalities are responsible for social welfare services including elderly care as well as for sanitation and various health and environment issues such as food hygiene.

== See also ==
- Health care in Sweden
- Obesity in Sweden
- Suicide in Sweden
- COVID-19 pandemic in Sweden
