= Economic history of Sweden =

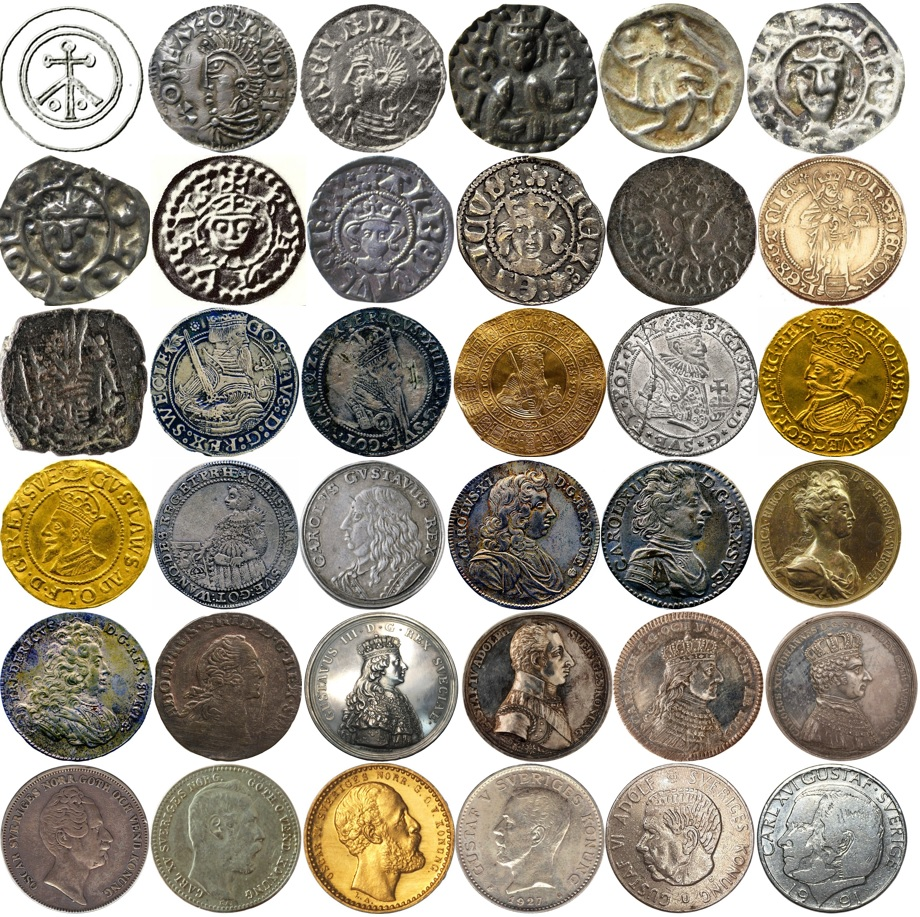
Successive images and symbols of 36 Swedish monarchs on their coins and medals from the 10th to the 20th century

The economic history of Sweden, since the Iron Age, has been characterized by extensive foreign trade based on a small number of export and import commodities, often derived from the widely available raw materials iron ore and wood. An industrial expansion in the latter half of the 19th century transformed the society on many levels. Natural-resource-rich regions benefited from the First Industrial Revolution. A growth surge in Sweden later benefited virtually the whole country during the Second Industrial Revolution. It fostered a broad export-oriented engineering industry with companies such as LM Ericsson, Asea, Alfa Laval, Aga, Electrolux, SKF and Volvo reaching well established positions on the global market and becoming drivers of GDP growth. In addition to engineering, the pulp and paper, steel, and chemical industries developed to reach international prominence. By the 1970s, Sweden had become one of the wealthiest nations of the world. The growth slowed down during the following decades, which were characterized by public deficits and structural change.

== Age of Liberty (1718–1773) ==
The Great Northern War (1700–1721) left Sweden in a state of economic and demographic ruin. When King Charles XII died in 1718, the Riksdag of the Estates were convinced that it was the system of absolute monarchy, which reduced their power, that had brought the downfall of the country. Thus, after Charles' death, they established a system of quasi-democratic rule that ushered in the "Age of Liberty". This period brought economic and social upheaval as well as industrial development. However, by the time the Age of Liberty ended in 1772 (as a result of a self-coup by King Gustav III), Sweden was by all objective measures a weaker nation than it was during its "Era of Great Power". Its land was diminished, its monopoly over the bar iron trade was gone, and it was lagging behind in the race towards early industrialisation. This decline can be attributed both to fiscal, monetary and executive policy errors by the various Riksdag parties in power, as well as to technological and economic shifts which allowed Sweden's rivals and neighbours get ahead on the global stage. It was, however, the agricultural reforms, the early industrial developments, and the gradual change from mercantilism to free trade that occurred during this period which pioneered the path for Sweden's Agricultural Revolution in the 1790s and eventual large scale industrialization in the mid to late 19th century.

== Agricultural revolution and proto-industrialization (1790–1815) ==
During the period 1790-1815 Sweden experienced two parallel economic movements: an agricultural revolution with larger agricultural estates (land reclamation - Enclosure Act of Sweden), the crown transferring areas to private farmers, new crops and farming tools and a commercialization of farming, and a proto-industrialisation, with small industries being established in the countryside and with workers switching between agricultural work in the summer season and industrial production in the winter season. This led to economic growth benefiting large sections of the population and leading up to a consumption revolution starting in the 1820s. It also led to rapid demographic increase.

The early division of labor resulted in household handicraft being largely restricted to the region's natural geographic resource. The "town economic policy" of the 17th century banned rural trade for the purpose of drawing a clear line between the urban and rural economics. Craft and industrial production were regarded as urban source of livelihood, therefore centralized manufacturing were preferred. This thus paved way to the Industrial Revolution of Sweden in the early 19th century.

== Early Industrialization, regional specialization and institutional changes (1815–1850) ==
In the period 1815-1850 the proto-industries developed into more specialized and larger industries. This period witnessed increasing regional specialization with mining in Bergslagen, textile mills in Sjuhäradsbygden and forestry in Norrland. Several important institutional changes took place in this period, such as free and mandatory public schooling introduced 1842 (as the first country in the world), the abolishment of a previous national monopoly on trade in handicrafts - the skråväsendet - in 1846, and a stock company law in 1848.

== Industrial Revolution; Export growth, railroads and investment take off (1850–1890) ==
During the period 1850-1890 Sweden witnessed a veritable explosion in its export sector, with agricultural crops, wood and steel being the three dominating categories. Important institutional changes in this period included the abolishment of most tariffs and other barriers to free trade in the 1850s and the introduction of the gold standard in 1873, linking the Swedish krona at a fixed parity to gold. These institutional changes helped the expansion of free trade.

During this period Sweden's investment quota (investments/GDP) went from 5% to 10%, called take off. During this period modern economic growth, with yearly GDP growth of around 2% made its advent in Sweden. Large infrastructural investments were made during this period, mainly in the expanding rail road network, which was financed in part by the government and in part by private enterprises.

== Second Industrial Revolution (1890–1950) ==
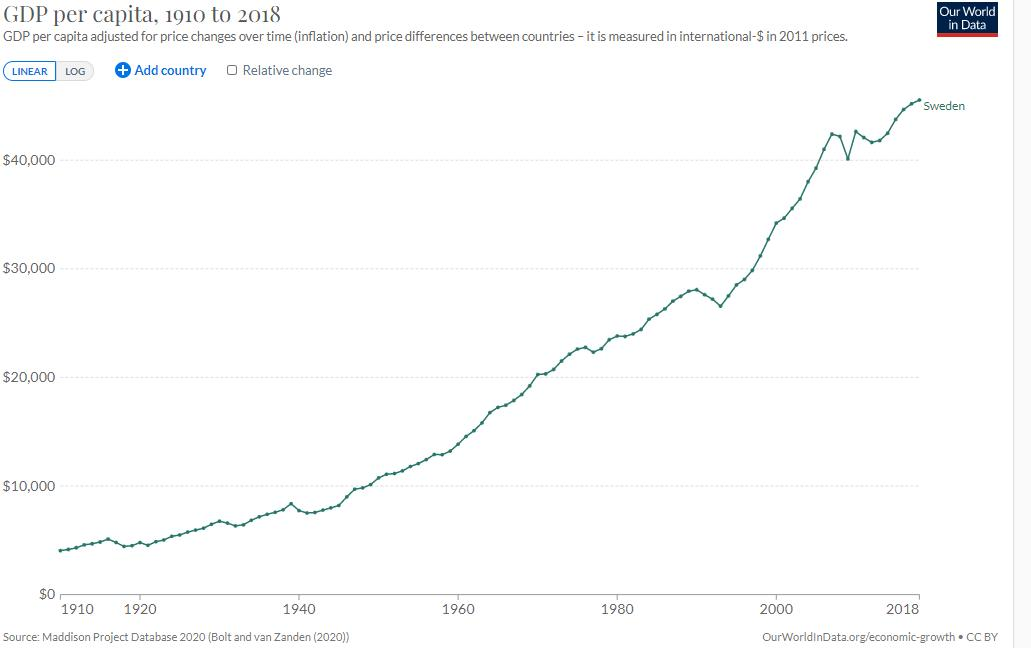
Historical development of real GDP per capita in Sweden from 1910 to 2018

During the period 1890-1930 the Second Industrial Revolution took place in Sweden. During this period new industries developed, with their focus on the domestic market: mechanical engineering, power utilities, paper making and textile industries. The rapid expansion of these industries was clearly helped by the existence of a well functioning risk capital market: the Stockholm Stock Exchange was established in 1866, the Bank of Sweden (founded in 1668 as the first central bank in the world) in 1897 was given legal rights as the sole issuer of bank notes in Sweden and given status as lender of last resort, this making it easier to establish small independent private commercial banks, leading to a rapid expansion in the number of private banks and also to a rapid credit expansion. The private banks issued loans to start-up companies, with stocks as security. As the company was in business and showing positive business figures, the stocks were sold on the stock market, enabling the bank to lend the money to other start-up companies. The rapid credit expansion led to bank tragedy in 1907, as well as a property market collapse.

Having imported vast amounts of foreign capital to finance its industrialization, during a 60-year period, from 1850 to 1910, Sweden was probably one of the leading debtor nations in the world by 1910. This situation would change rapidly in the coming decade. In 1914 the First World War commenced and international demand for Swedish exports of strategically important products such as steel, to be used in the armaments industry, increased rapidly. The warring nations had imposed severe limitations on trade between each other, as a neutral country, Sweden suffered indirectly from scarcity of commodities. The warring nations, such as the UK, to a large extent used the printing of new money as a means of financing the war, leading to inflation and thus causing the prices for Swedish exports to rise rapidly. The massive transfers of foreign money as payments for wartime Swedish exports meant that Sweden went from having been one of the most indebted nations in the world before the war, to being a net creditor after the war.

== Recent trends ==
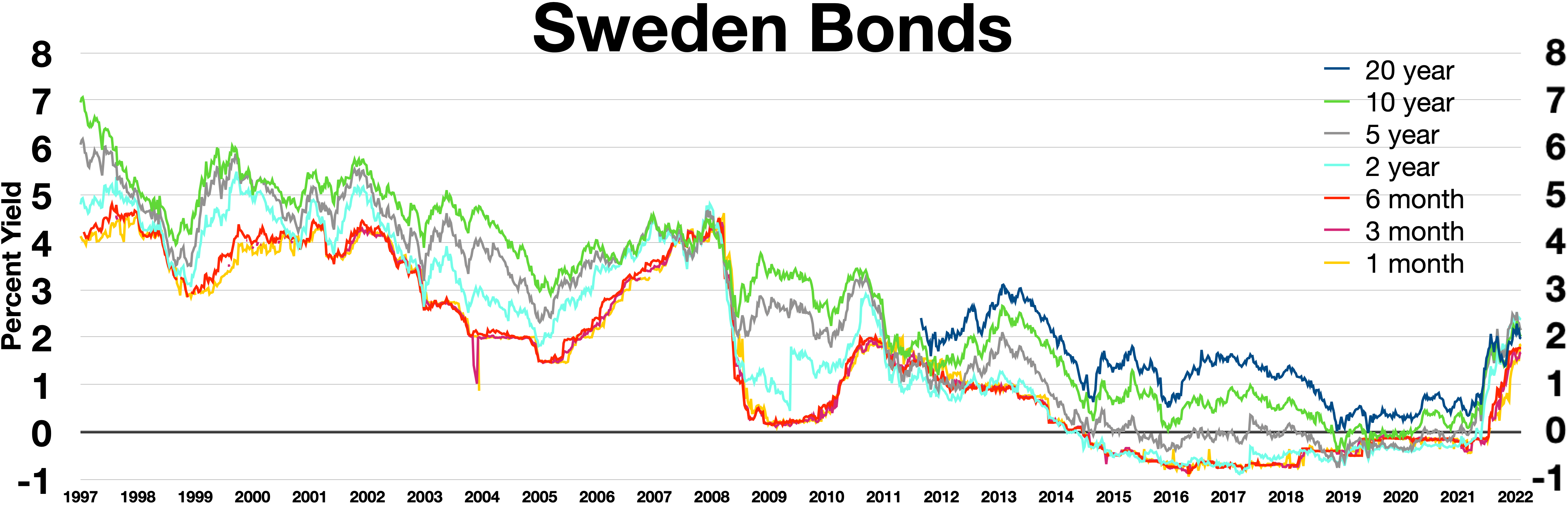
Sweden bonds 20 year 10 year 5 year 2 year 6 month 3 month 1 month

During the 1980s, Sweden attempted to preserve its model of capitalism plus a generous welfare state through what it called a "bridging policy." Unintended consequences resulted. There was high inflation as well as overheated real estate and financial markets and a negative real rate of interest. After 1991, these factors caused a recession with high unemployment. There were political reverberations and business called for neoliberal government policies. By 2000, however, the positive trends dominated. Compared to the rest of Europe, unemployment in Sweden was low, while economic growth has been high, inflation low, the budget in balance, and the balance of payments positive.

== Historical statistics ==
=== Wealth inequality ===
A 2017 study found that Sweden had lower levels of inequality than other Western European states in 1750 but that the levels converged with those of other European states to become roughly the same by 1900.
