= Swedish krona =

Currency of Sweden

svensk krona (Swedish)
Swedish krona banknotes
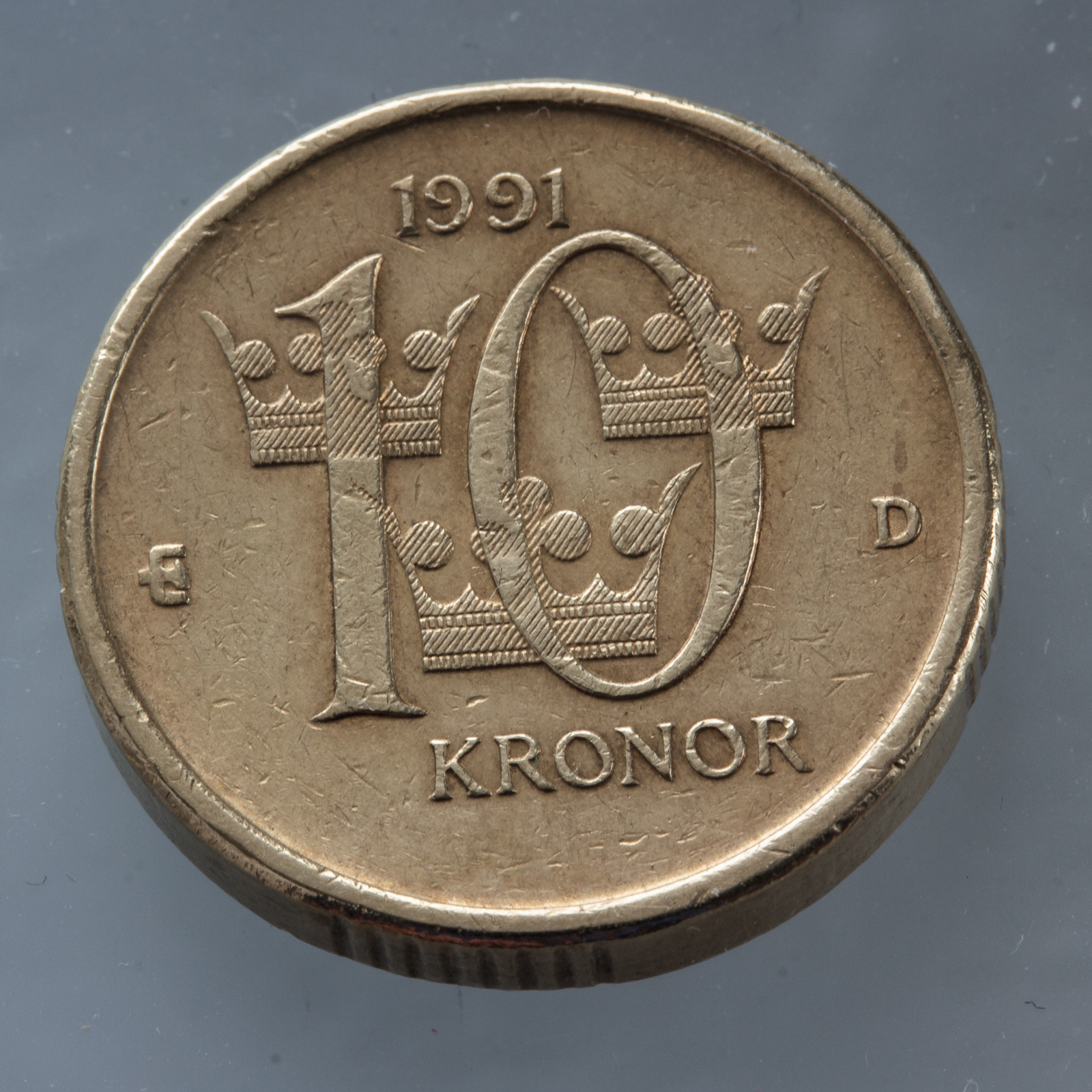
10 kr coin

ISO 4217
- Code: SEK (numeric: 752)
- Subunit: 0.01

Units of account
- Base unit: krona
- Plural: kronor
- Symbol: kr and :-
- Nickname: spänn; riksdaler; crowns (English); lax/lakan/lök, papp, (rarely) bagare/bagis (1000 kr); röding (500 kr)
- Subunit
- 1/100: öre
- Plural
- öre: öre/ören

Denominations
- Banknotes
- Freq. used: 20, 50, 100, 200, 500 kr
- Rarely used: 1000 kr
- Coins
- Freq. used: 1, 2, 5, 10 kr

Demographics
- Date of introduction: 1873
- Replaced: Swedish riksdaler
- User(s): Sweden

Issuance
- Central bank: Sveriges Riksbank
- Website: www.riksbank.se/en-gb/
- Printer: De La Rue

Valuation
- Inflation: 0.8% (target 2.0%)
- Source: February 2025
- Method: CPI

The krona (Swedish: [ˈkrûːna]; plural: kronor; sign: kr; code: SEK) is the currency of Sweden. Both the ISO code "SEK" and currency sign "kr" are in common use for the krona; the former precedes or follows the value, the latter usually follows it but, especially in the past, it sometimes preceded the value. In English, the currency is sometimes referred to as the Swedish crown, as krona means "crown" in Swedish. As the ninth-most traded currency in the world by value, the Swedish krona is one of the world's G10 currencies, and is the fourth-most traded from Europe after the euro, British sterling and Swiss franc. Banknotes are issued by the Sveriges Riksbank.

One krona is subdivided into 100 öre (singular; plural öre or ören, where the former is always used after a cardinal number, hence "50 öre", but otherwise the latter is often preferred in contemporary speech). Coins as small as 1 öre were formerly in use, but the last coin smaller than 1 krona was discontinued in 2010. Goods can still be priced in öre, but all sums are rounded to the nearest krona when paying with cash. The word öre is ultimately derived from the Latin word for gold (aurum).

== History ==
The introduction of the krona, which replaced the riksdaler at par, was a result of the Scandinavian Monetary Union, which came into effect in 1876 and lasted until the beginning of World War I. The parties to the union were the Scandinavian countries, where the name was krona in Sweden and krone in Denmark and Norway, which in English literally means "crown". The three currencies were on the gold standard, with the krona/krone defined as 1/2480 of a kilogram of pure gold.

The mutual equivalence of all three currencies ended in World War I when their convertibility to gold was suspended. While their gold parities remained during most of the interwar period, these currencies were generally quoted at varying market rates.

The krona is one of the six currencies included in the U.S. Dollar Index.

== Coins ==
=== History ===
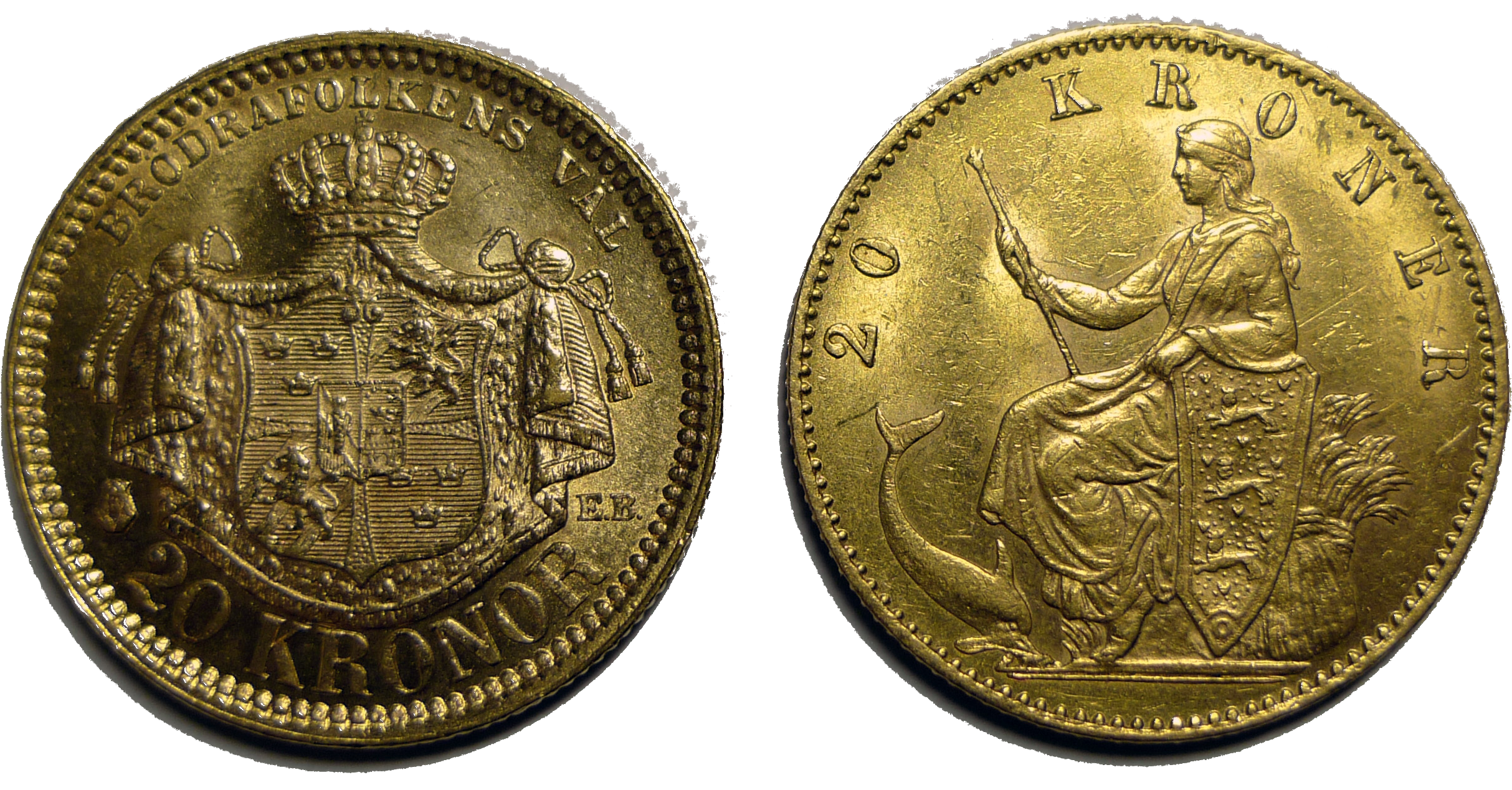
Two golden 20 kr coins from the Scandinavian Monetary Union, which were based on a gold standard. The coin to the left is Swedish; the right is Danish.

Between 1873 and 1876, coins in denominations of 1, 2, 5, 10, 25, and 50 öre and 1, 2, 10, and 20 kronor were introduced. The 1, 2 and 5 öre were in bronze, the 10, 25, 50 öre and 1 krona and 2 kronor were in silver, and the 10 and 20 kronor were in gold. Gold 5-kronor coins were added in 1881.

In 1873 the Scandinavian Monetary Union currency was fixed so that 2,480 kronor purchased 1 kg of gold. In 2017 the price of gold is 365,289 kronor per kg. So one öre in 1873 bought as much gold as 1.47 kronor in 2017. So if it is reasonable to have the smallest denomination coin 1 krona today, in 1873 a reasonable smallest denomination coin was 1 öre. A 10 kr gold coin weighed 4.4803 grams with 900 fineness so that the fine weight was 4.03327 grams or exactly 1/248th of a kilogram.

In 1902, production of gold coins ceased, and was briefly restarted in 1920 and 1925 before ceasing entirely. Due to metal shortages during World War I, iron replaced bronze between 1917 and 1919. Nickel-bronze replaced silver in the 10, 25 and 50 öre in 1920, with silver returning in 1927.

Metal shortages due to World War II again led to changes in the Swedish coinage. Between 1940 and 1947, the nickel-bronze 10, 25 and 50 öre were again issued. In 1942, iron again replaced bronze (until 1952) and the silver content of the other coins was reduced. In 1962, cupronickel replaced silver in the 10-öre, 25-öre and 50-öre coins.

In 1968, the 2-kronor switched to cupronickel and the 1-krona switched to cupronickel-clad copper (it was replaced entirely by cupronickel in 1982). Nonetheless, all previous mintages of the 1-krona (since 1875) and 2-kronor (since 1876) were still legal tender until 2017, though 2-kronor coins were extremely rarely seen in circulation as they have not been issued since 1971. The 2-kronor coins contained 40% silver until 1966, which meant they had been for several years worth much more than face value, so most have been bought and melted down by arbitrageurs, and the rest are kept by collectors.

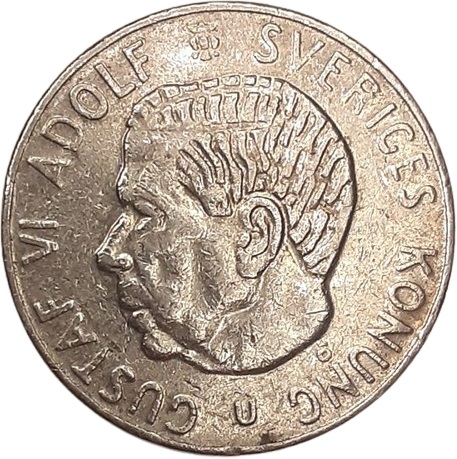
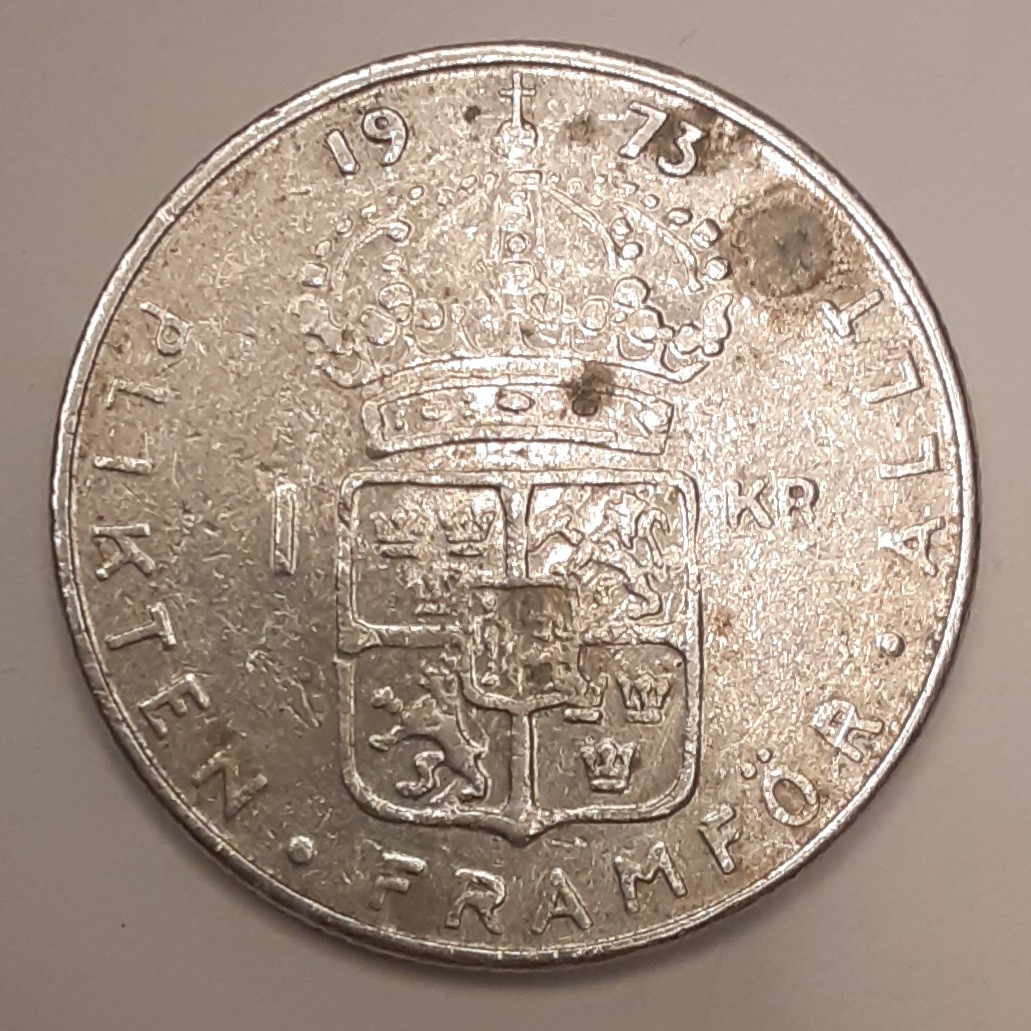
1 Swedish krona minted in 1973

In 1954, 1955 and 1971, 5-kronor silver coins were produced, with designs similar to contemporary 1-krona and 2-kronor coins. In 1972, a new, smaller 5-kronor coin was introduced, struck in cupronickel-clad nickel. The current design has been produced since 1976. 5-kronor coins minted since 1954 are legal tender but tend to be kept by collectors for their silver content.

The royal motto of the monarch is also inscribed on many of the coins. A new 5-kronor coin was designed in 1974, at a time when there were political efforts to abandon the monarchy and the young inexperienced king. The monarchy remained, but the 5-kronor was not given a portrait. Coins minted before 1974 have the same size, but contain the portrait of King Gustav VI Adolf and his royal motto.

Cash rounding (Swedish: öresavrundning), commonly called Swedish rounding, is a legally-enforced method of rounding off change, up or down, to the nearest unit of physical currency, while retaining the öre as pricing and accounting unit. It was required in conjunction with the phaseout of smaller coins, as follows:

- 1971: 1- and 2-öre phased out; change rounded to nearest 5-öre.
- 1984: 5- and 25-öre phased out; change rounded to nearest 10-öre.
- 1991: 10-öre phased out; change rounded to nearest 50-öre.
- 2010: 50-öre phased out; change rounded to nearest 1-krona.

In 1971 the 2-kronor coin ceased production. In 1972 the sizes of the 5-öre and 5-kronor coins were reduced.

In 1991, aluminium-brass ("Nordic gold") 10-kronor coins were introduced; previous 10-kronor coins are not legal tender. In the same year bronze-coloured 50-öre coins were introduced.

On 18 December 2008, the Riksbank announced a proposal to phase out the 50-öre, the final öre coin, by 2010. The öre would still remain a subdivision unit for electronic payments. The reasons may have included low purchasing power, higher production and distribution cost than the value and the coins cannot be used in most parking machines and vending machines. On 25 March 2009, the Riksdag formally decided to enact the law to abolish 50-öre coins as legal tender. Under that law, the final date payments could be made with 50-öre coins was 30 September 2010. Remaining 50-öre coins could be exchanged at banks until the end of March 2011.

=== Contemporary ===
On 11 September 2012, the Riksbank announced a new series of coins with new sizes to replace the 1-krona and 5-kronor coins; the new coins arrived in October 2016. The design of the coins follows the theme of singer-songwriter Ted Gärdestad's song, "Sol, vind och vatten" (English: "Sun, wind and water"), with the designs depicting the elements on the reverse side of the coins. This also included the reintroduction of the 2-kronor coin, while the current 10-kronor coin remained the same. The new coins also have a new portrait of the king in their design. One of the reasons for a new series of coins was to end the use of nickel (for allergy reasons). Vending machines and parking meters have to a fairly high degree stopped accepting coins and accept only bank cards or mobile phone payments.

After the launch of the current coin series in 2016, all the old kronor coins have been invalid since 2017. They cannot be used for payments, nor can they be exchanged for legal tender at any bank, and are instead instructed to be recycled as metal.

Jubilee and commemorative coins have been minted, and those since 1897 are also legal tender.

Circulating series (1991–2016)
Images		Value	Technical parameters				Description			Issued from
Obverse	Reverse	Value	Diameter (mm)	Thickness (mm)	Mass (g)	Composition	Edge	Obverse	Reverse	Issued from
		1 krona	19.50	1.79	3.60	Copper-plated steel	Reeded	Carl XVI Gustaf; year of issue	Stylised solar corona; Three crowns; value; lettering: Sverige	2016
		2 kronor	22.50	1.79	4.80	Copper-plated steel	Interrupted reeding	Carl XVI Gustaf; year of issue	Stylised whirlwind; Three crowns; value; lettering: Sverige	2016
		5 kronor	23.75	1.95	6.10	Nordic gold: Cu: 89% Al: 5% Zn: 5% Sn: 1%	Smooth	Carl XVI Gustaf; year of issue	Stylised waves; Three crowns; value; lettering: Sverige	2016
		10 kronor	20.50	2.90	6.60	Nordic gold: Cu: 89% Al: 5% Zn: 5% Sn: 1%	Interrupted reeding	Carl XVI Gustaf; royal motto	Three crowns; value; year of issue	1991–2000
		10 kronor	20.50	2.90	6.60	Nordic gold: Cu: 89% Al: 5% Zn: 5% Sn: 1%	Interrupted reeding	Carl XVI Gustaf; year of issue	Three crowns; value; royal motto	2001
For table standards, see the coin specification table.

== Banknotes ==
=== History ===
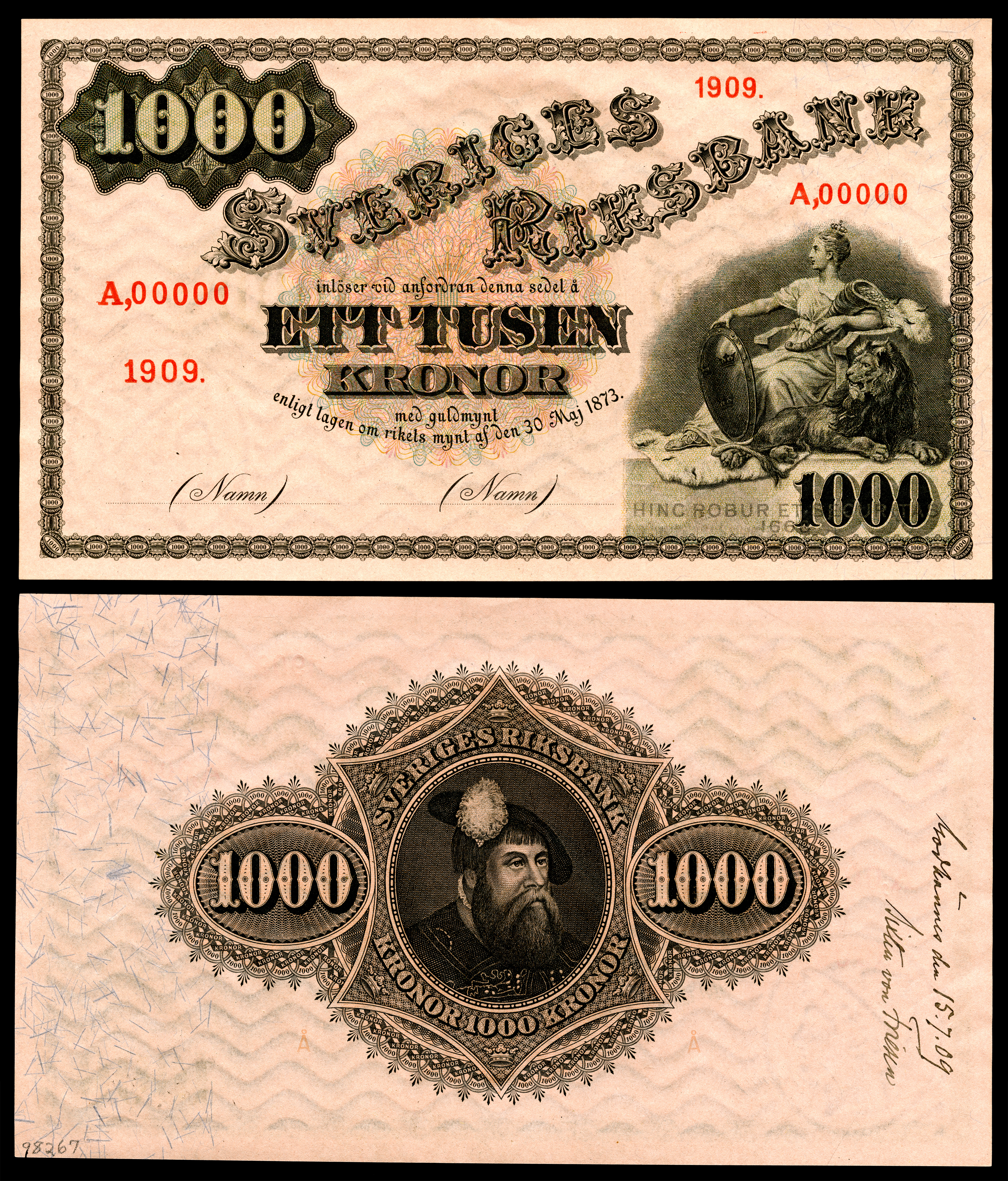
1909 specimen of a Sveriges Riksbank 1,000-kronor note

In 1874, notes were introduced by the Riksbank in denominations of 1 krona and 5, 10, 50, 100 and 1,000 kronor. The 1 krona was only initially issued for two years, although it reappeared between 1914 and 1920. In 1939 and 1958, 10,000-kronor notes were issued.

Production of the 5-kronor note ceased in 1981, although a coin had been issued since 1972. With the introduction of a 10-krona coin in 1991, production of 10-kronor notes ceased and a 20-kronor note was introduced.

All remaining one krona banknotes became invalid after 31 December 1987. All remaining five krona and ten krona banknotes became invalid after 31 December 1998.

An exhaustive list of every banknote design since 1874 is not included, but the following five designs were or will be retired in 2016–2017. The oldest design began to be printed in 1985.

A 20-kronor banknote (a new denomination) was printed 1991–1995 with a portrait of the writer Selma Lagerlöf and on the reverse was an engraved interpretation of a passage from the book The Wonderful Adventures of Nils. The banknote became invalid after 31 December 2005. A more secure version with the same portrait was printed from 1997 to 2008 and became invalid after 30 June 2016.

A 50-kronor banknote (3rd design since 1896) was printed 1996–2003 with a portrait of the singer Jenny Lind and on the reverse was a picture of a silver harp and its tonal range. The banknote became invalid after 31 December 2013. A more secure version with the same portrait was printed from 2006 to 2011 and became invalid after 30 June 2016.

A 100-kronor banknote (3rd design since 1898) was printed 1986–2000 with a portrait of the botanist Carl Linnaeus and on the reverse was a drawing of a bee pollinating a flower. The banknote became invalid after 31 December 2005. A more secure version with the same portrait was introduced in 2001 and became invalid after 30 June 2017.

A 500-kronor banknote (a new denomination) in a blue shade was introduced in 1985 with a portrait of King Charles XI and on the reverse an engraving depicts Christopher Polhem, the "father of Swedish engineering". These banknotes became invalid on 31 December 1998. A 500-kronor banknote (red, but without foil strips) with the same portrait was printed 1989–2000. This banknote became invalid after 31 December 2005. A more secure version with the same portrait was introduced in 2001 and became invalid after 30 June 2017. The banknote had some controversy in 1985 because of the executions of "Snapphane" guerrilla warriors that King Charles XI ordered.

The first two designs of 1,000-kronor banknotes (printed from 1894 to 1950 and 1952–1973) became invalid on 31 December 1987. The third design with portrait of King Charles XIV John and Jöns Jacob Berzelius (printed 1976–1988) and declared invalid on 31 December 1998. In preparation for retirement of the 10,000-kronor banknotes a new 1,000-kronor banknotes (of the 4th design / without foil strips) was printed from 1989 to 1991 with a portrait of Gustav Vasa and on the reverse a harvest picture from Olaus Magnus's Description of the Northern Peoples from 1555. Circulation peaked at over 48 million in 2001.

On 15 March 2006, the Riksbank introduced a new, more secure 1,000-kronor banknote with the same portrait and the Riksbank became the first central bank in the world to use the security feature of MOTION (a moving image in the striped band) on the new 1,000-kronor banknote. When the banknote is tilted, the picture in the striped band appears to move. The Vasa banknote without security thread became invalid after 31 December 2013 at which time there was only 10 million in circulation. The Vasa banknotes with the security thread became invalid after 30 June 2016 at which time there was under 4 million in circulation. Replacement banknotes featuring Dag Hammarskjöld became valid on 1 October 2015, but were circulated in considerably fewer quantities (less than 3.5 million), thus reducing the supply of cash in Sweden.

The 10,000 krona banknote was always printed in small quantities as it was one of the most valuable banknotes in the world. The first design featuring the Head of Mercury was printed in 1939 and became invalid after 31 December 1987. The second design was printed 1958 and featured a portrait of Gustav VI Adolf, and became invalid after 31 December 1991.

Invalid banknotes can be redeemed via the Riksbank, with an administration fee of 200 kronor.

=== Current series ===
On 6 April 2011, the Riksbank announced the names of the persons whose portraits would decorate the new series of banknotes that would be introduced in 2015. This would also include a new 200-kronor banknote. These are:

- Astrid Lindgren on the 20-kronor banknote; purple
- Evert Taube on the 50-kronor banknote; orange
- Greta Garbo on the 100-kronor banknote; blue
- Ingmar Bergman on the 200-kronor banknote; green
- Birgit Nilsson on the 500-kronor banknote; red
- Dag Hammarskjöld on the 1,000-kronor banknote; brown

On 24 April 2012, the Riksbank announced the base for the new designs of the banknotes, based on Göran Österlund's entry titled Cultural Journey.

The first banknotes, the 20, 50, 200, and 1,000 krona, were issued on 1 October 2015 with the other two notes, the 100 and 500 krona, followed on 3 October 2016.

Cultural Journey series (2017) Designer: Göran Österlund
Image	Value	Dimensions (mm)	Main colour	Description		Issued from
Image	Value	Dimensions (mm)	Main colour	Obverse	Reverse	Issued from
	20 kr	120 × 66	Violet	Astrid Lindgren; Pippi Longstocking	Forest road, Småland; Linnaea borealis	1 October 2015
	50 kr	126 × 66	Orange	Evert Taube; Så länge skutan kan gå	Bohuslän coastline, Tanum rock carvings; Lonicera periclymenum	1 October 2015
	100 kr	133 × 66	Blue	Greta Garbo; filmstrip	Stockholm panorama; Nymphaea alba, Fritillaria meleagris	3 October 2016
	200 kr	140 × 66	Green	Ingmar Bergman; The Seventh Seal	Rauks in Fårö, Gotland; Hedera helix	1 October 2015
	500 kr	147 × 66	Red	Birgit Nilsson; Die Walküre	Öresund Bridge, ox-eye daisy, Skåne	3 October 2016
	1000 kr	154 × 66	Brown	Dag Hammarskjöld, UN secretariat and emblem	Laponian area and Sarek National Park, Lapland; Dryas octopetala	1 October 2015
For table standards, see the banknote specification table.

==== 500 kr banknote controversy ====
Opera singer Malena Ernman has criticized the Riksbank for choosing a design where Birgit Nilsson was depicted performing Die Walküre by Richard Wagner. She pointed out that it was very inappropriate to include something by Wagner, whose works were associated with Nazi Germany, in a time of increasing problems with antisemitism in Sweden. Wagner died in 1883, long before the Nazi era, and the association is that Hitler liked his music. The Riksbank replied saying that it is "unfortunate that the choice of design is seen as negative", and stated that it is not going to be changed.

Dagens Nyheter journalist Björn Wiman went further in his criticism, condemning the Riksbank for selecting Nilsson at all for the 500-kronor banknote. He brings up an example from Nilsson's 1995 autobiography, where she described Mauritz Rosengarten from Decca using antisemitic jokes about greed.

== Exchange rate ==
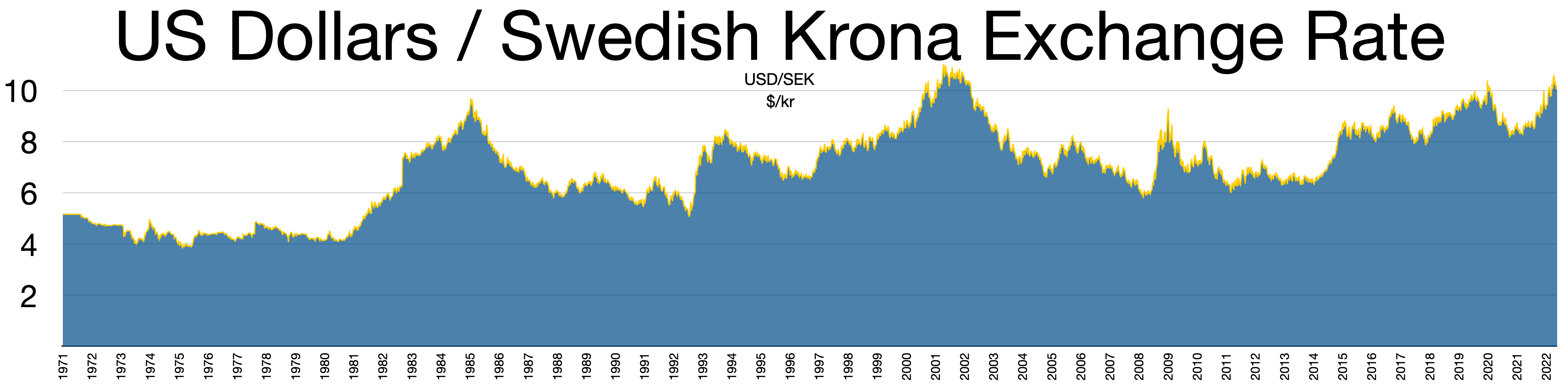
USD/Krona exchange rate

The cost of one Euro in Swedish krona (from 1999)

To see where Swedish krona ranks in "most traded currencies", read the article on the foreign exchange market.

The exchange rate of the Swedish krona against other currencies has historically been dependent on the monetary policy pursued by Sweden at the time. Since the Swedish banking rescue, a managed float regimen has been upheld.

The weakest the krona has been relative to the euro was 6 March 2009 when one euro bought 11.6465 SEK. The strongest the krona has been relative to the euro was on 13 August 2012 when one euro bought 8.2065 SEK. The weakness in the euro was due to the crisis in Greece which began in July 2012 and fear of further spreading to Italy and Spain. The average exchange rate since the beginning of 2002 when the euro banknote and coins were issued and 1 March 2017 was 9.2884 SEK/EUR.

Year	USD	EUR	GBP	CHF
1993	7.2768	9.1042	11.6993	5.2784
1994	7.6494	9.1390	11.8094	5.6536
1995	6.8301	9.2275	11.2644	6.0401
1996	6.7412	8.3996	10.4606	5.4377
1997	7.6342	8.6249	12.5048	5.2618
1998	8.0048	8.9306	13.1715	5.4966
1999	8.2010	8.8076	13.3720	5.5041
2000	9.4139	8.4465	13.8640	5.4254
2001	10.5702	9.2516	14.8691	6.1274
2002	9.8761	9.1627	14.5797	6.2448
2003	8.2107	9.1250	13.1946	6.0042
2004	7.5739	9.1268	13.4560	5.9125
2005	7.6133	9.2848	13.5782	5.9970
2006	7.4021	9.2549	13.5752	5.8842
2007	6.8221	9.2481	13.5281	5.6314
2008	6.5808	9.6055	12.0912	6.0585
2009	7.6458	10.6213	11.9260	7.0342
2010	7.2049	9.5413	11.1256	6.9114
2011	6.4969	9.0335	10.4115	7.3454
2012	6.7754	8.7053	10.7340	7.2227
2013	6.5140	8.6494	10.1863	7.0255
2014	6.8577	9.0969	11.2917	7.4903
2015	8.4350	9.3562	12.8962	8.7655
2016	8.5613	9.4704	11.5664	8.6882
2017	8.5380	9.6326	10.9896	8.6692
2018	8.6921	10.2567	11.5928	8.8836
2019	9.4604	10.5892	12.0658	9.5185
2020	9.2037	10.4867	11.7981	9.7978
2021	8.5815	10.1449	11.8022	9.3844
2022	10.1245	10.6317	12.4669	10.5949
2023	10.6128	11.4765	13.1979	11.8173

=== Current SEK exchange rates ===
From Google Finance:	AUD CAD CHF CNY EUR GBP HKD JPY USD DKK NOK
From Yahoo! Finance:	AUD CAD CHF CNY EUR GBP HKD JPY USD DKK NOK
From XE.com:	AUD CAD CHF CNY EUR GBP HKD JPY USD DKK NOK
From OANDA:	AUD CAD CHF CNY EUR GBP HKD JPY USD DKK NOK

== Relationship to the euro ==
According to the 1994 accession treaty (effective 1 January 1995), Sweden is required to join the eurozone and therefore must convert to the euro once the convergence criteria are met. Notwithstanding this, on 14 September 2003, a consultative Swedish referendum was held on the euro, in which 56% of voters were opposed to the adoption of the currency, out of an overall turnout of 82.6%. The Swedish government has argued such a course of action is possible since one of the requirements for eurozone membership is a prior two-year membership of the ERM II. By simply not joining the exchange rate mechanism, the Swedish government is provided a formal loophole avoiding the theoretical requirement of adopting the euro.

Some of Sweden's major parties continue to believe it would be in the national interest to join, but all parties have pledged to abide by the results of the referendum, and none have shown any interest in raising the issue again. There was an agreement among the parties not to discuss the issue before the 2010 general election. In a poll from May 2007, 33.3% were in favour, while 53.8% were against and 13.0% were uncertain.

In February 2009, Fredrik Reinfeldt, the prime minister of Sweden, stated that a new referendum on the euro issue will not be held until support is gained from the people and all the major parties. Therefore, the timing is now at the discretion of the Social Democrats. He added, the request of Mona Sahlin, former leader of the Social Democratic Party, for deferral of a new referendum until after the 2010 mandate period should be respected.

As of 2014, support for Swedish membership of the euro among the general population is low. In September 2013, support fell as low as 9%. The only party in the Riksdag that supports Swedish entry in the euro (as of 2015) is the Liberal Party.

== Banknotes and coins per capita in circulation ==
Sweden is a wealthy country and in the 1970s and 1980s the value of banknotes and coins per capita was one of the highest in the world. In 1991, the largest banknote worth 10,000kr that was in circulation since 1958 was declared invalid and no longer was legal tender. For a discussion of the financial and banking crisis that hit Sweden in the early 1990s see the article History of Sweden (1991–present) and Swedish banking rescue.

Unlike the United States, which by policy never declares issued money invalid, Sweden and most other European countries have a date when older series of banknotes or older coin designs are invalid and are no longer legal tender. Invalid old banknotes of any age can, however, be deposited in the Riksbank, and the value be sent to a bank account.

From the years 2001 to 2008 banknotes and coins were circulated at a near constant level of around 12,000 krona per capita, but in 2006 a modified 1,000-krona banknote with a motion security strip was produced. Within seven years the banknotes without the strip were declared invalid, leaving only a radically reduced number of banknotes with foil valid. The Swish mobile payment system was established in Sweden in 2012 and become a popular alternative to cash payments. The Vasa 1,000-krona banknote without the foil strip became invalid after 31 December 2013, and the pieces with the foil strip are invalid after 30 June 2016.

Although many countries are performing larger and larger share of transactions by electronic means, Sweden is unique in that it is also reducing its cash in circulation by a significant percentage. According to Bank for International Settlements the last year Sweden was surpassed in cash on a per capita basis converted to United States dollars by the US in 1993, the Euro Area in 2003, Australia in 2007, Canada in 2009, United Kingdom and Saudi Arabia in 2013, South Korea in 2014, Russia in 2016, and Mexico in 2019. As of 2019 Sweden was still circulating more cash per person (converted to USD) than Argentina, Brazil, Turkey, India, Indonesia, and South Africa.

The tables show the value of the banknotes and coins per capita for participating countries on Committee on Payments and Market Infrastructures (CPMI). Local currency is converted to US dollars using end of the year rates.

Banknotes and coin in circulation in Sweden at end of year
Year	Per capita	% in 1000 SEK banknotes	End-of-year SEK/USD	Equivalent USD	Surpassing Sweden	%GDP
1988	6,459 kr	not largest note	6.1325	$1,053		
1989	7,118 kr	not largest note	6.2270	$1,143		
1990	7,174 kr	not largest note	5.6980	$1,259		
1991	8,828 kr	not largest note	5.5500	$1,591		
1992	8,529 kr	53.1%	7.0500	$1,210		
1993	8,684 kr	52.6%	8.3325	$1,042	United States	
1994	8,696 kr	51.8%	7.4615	$1,166		
1995	8,682 kr	49.4%	6.6177	$1,312		
1996	9,139 kr	47.8%	6.8859	$1,327		4.4%
1997	9,360 kr	47.4%	7.9082	$1,184		4.3%
1998	9,750 kr	47.5%	8.0770	$1,207		4.5%
1999	11,120 kr	47.5%	8.5233	$1,305		4.9%
2000	11,013 kr	47.0%	9.4909	$1,160		4.4%
2001	12,039 kr	45.2%	10.5540	$1,141		4.7%
2002	11,989 kr	43.8%	8.7278	$1,374		4.6%
2003	12,161 kr	41.9%	7.1892	$1,692	Euro Area	4.3%
2004	12,107 kr	41.8%	6.6226	$1,828		4.1%
2005	12,301 kr	41.0%	7.9584	$1,546		4.1%
2006	12,375 kr	37.6%	6.8644	$1,803		3.9%
2007	12,494 kr	34.0%	6.4136	$1,948	Australia	3.7%
2008	12,130 kr	30.6%	7.8106	$1,553		3.5%
2009	11,681 kr	28.7%	7.1165	$1,641	Canada	3.5%
2010	11,106 kr	27.3%	6.7097	$1,655		3.1%
2011	10,515 kr	25.2%	6.8877	$1,527		2.8%
2012	10,059 kr	22.3%	6.5045	$1,547		2.6%
2013	8,849 kr	11.3%	6.4238	$1,378	Saudi Arabia, UK	2.3%
2014	8,578 kr	9.4%	7.7366	$1,109	Korea, Poland	2.1%
2015	7,362 kr	7.7%	8.4408	$872	China	1.7%
2016	6,242 kr	7.7%	9.0622	$689	Russia	1.4%
2017	5,731 kr	8.3%	8.2080	$698		1.3%
2018	6,111 kr	7.3%	8.9562	$682		1.3%
2019	6,175 kr	6.6%	9.299	$664	Mexico	1.3%
2020	5,768 kr	6.2%	8.177	$742		1.3%

The circulation levels in the table above were reported to the Bank for International Settlements. Possible discrepancies with these statistics and other sources may be because some sources exclude "commemorative banknotes and coins" (3.20% of total for Sweden in 2015) and other sources exclude "banknotes and coin held by banks" (2.68% of total for Sweden in 2015) as opposed "banknotes and coin in circulation outside banks".

Circulation levels of cash on a per capita basis, are reduced by 51% from the high in 2007 compared to 2018. Speculation about Sweden declaring all banknotes and coins invalid at some future date is widespread in the media with Björn Ulvaeus as a celebrity advocate of a cashless Sweden which he believes will result in a safer society because simple robbery will involve stealing goods that must be fenced.

The value of the payments between households, companies and authorities in Sweden amounts to about 20,000 kronor annual per capita in cash. In shops, almost one in seven payments is made in cash. More than half of the adult population has the Swish payment app. Annual withdrawals from Swedish ATMs in 2015 amount to 15,300 kronor per capita. According to Skingsley, "what some consumers, smaller companies and local clubs often see as a problem, is not so much getting hold of cash, but being able to deposit it in a bank account."

On July 1 2026, Sweden implemented a new law to preserve the use of physical currency following a rapid decline in cash transactions. Approved unanimously by the Riksdag, the legislation mandates that most grocery stores and pharmacies must accept banknotes and coins. Additionally, banks are required to ensure nationwide access to cash deposit services. The law aims to prevent digital exclusion for vulnerable groups and to strengthen national resilience against potential cyberattacks on digital payments systems.

To see how circulation of the Swedish krona ranks compared to other currencies see Bank for International Settlements#Red Books.

== The e-krona ==
The e-krona (electronic krona) is a proposed electronic currency to be issued directly by the Riksbank. It is different from the electronic transfers using commercial bank money as central bank money has no nominal credit risk, as it stands for a claim on the central bank, which cannot go bankrupt, at least not for debts in Swedish krona.

The declining use of cash in Sweden is going to be reinforced cyclically. As more businesses find that they can function without accepting cash, the number of businesses refusing to accept cash will increase. That will re-enforce the need for more and more citizens to get the Swish app which is already used by half the population. Cash machines, which are controlled by a Swedish bank consortium, are being dismantled by the hundreds, especially in rural areas.

The Riksbank has not taken a decision on issuing e-krona. First, the Riksbank needs to investigate a number of technical, legal and practical issues. "The declining use of cash in Sweden means that this is more of a burning issue for us than for most other central banks. Although it may appear simple at first glance to issue e-krona, this is something entirely new for a central bank and there is no precedent to follow". If the Riksbank chooses to issue e-krona, it is not to replace cash, but to act as a complement to it. "The Riksbank will continue issuing banknotes and coins as long as there is demand for them in society. It is our statutory duty and we will of course continue to live up to it," concluded Deputy Governor Cecilia Skingsley.

In December 2020, Sweden's Minister for Financial Markets Per Bolund announced a government review to explore the feasibility of moving to a digital currency that was expected to be completed by the end of November in 2022. Anna Kinberg Batra, a former chairwoman of the Riksbank's finance committee, was announced as the leader of the review. As of 2023, no decision has been made.

== See also ==
- Economy of Sweden
- Fyrk
- List of currencies in Europe
- Monetary policy of Sweden
- Scandinavian Monetary Union
- Swedish National Debt Office
