= List of tunnels in Sweden =

This list of tunnels in Sweden includes any road, rail or waterway tunnel in Sweden.

Name	Location	Type	Tubes	Length (km)
Kungsträdgården-Hjulsta	Stockholm	rail(metro)	2	14.3
Hallandsåstunneln	Ängelholm	railway	2	8.716
Gamla stan-Bergshamra	Stockholm	rail(metro)	2	8.5
City Tunnel, Malmö	Malmö	railway	2	6
Citybanan	Stockholm	railway	2	6
Namntalltunneln	Örnsköldsvik	railway	1	6
Björnböletunneln	Örnsköldsvik	railway	1	5.2
Arlandabanan	Arlanda	railway	1 and 2	5.083
Gamla stan-Thorildsplan	Stockholm	rail(metro)	2	4.7
Södra länken	Stockholm	motorway	2	4.5
Kroksbergstunneln	Härnösand	railway	1	4.3
Norralatunneln	Söderhamn	railway	1	3.85
Trollhättetunneln	Trollhättan	railway	1	3.54
Slussen-Liljeholmen	Stockholm	rail(metro)	2	3.3
Åskottunneln	Örnsköldsvik	railway	1	3.3
tunneln	Älvsbyn	railway	1	6.9
Muskötunneln	Nynäshamn	road	1	2.895
Norra länken	Stockholm	motorway	2	2.8
Lundbytunneln	Göteborg	motorway	2	2.06
Törnskogstunneln	Stockholm	motorway	2	2.058
Gårdatunneln	Göteborg	railway	1	2.163
Hammarkulletunneln	Göteborg	rail(tram)	1 and 2	2
Götatunneln	Göteborg	motorway	2	1.6
Söderledstunneln	Stockholm	motorway	2	1.6
Tingstadstunneln	Göteborg	motorway	2	0.45

Under construction:

- Förbifart Stockholm, road, 17 km (started in 2014, estimate completion in 2030)
- West Link, Gothenburg, railway, 2 tubes, 6 km (started in 2017, estimate completion in 2026)
- Varbergstunneln, Varberg, railway, 3.1 km (started in 2019, estimate completion in 2024)
- Extension of the Blue line, Kungsträdgården-Nacka, Metro, 8 km, making it 22 km (started in 2019, estimate completion in 2030)

Planned construction:

- Through Kolmården, railway, around 8 km (estimate start in 2021, estimate completion in 2035)
- Under the Göteborg Landvetter Airport, railway, around 5 km (estimate start in 2026, estimate completion in 2035)

== See also ==
- List of tunnels by location
