= International rankings of Sweden =

Rankings of Sweden

These are the international rankings of Sweden.

== Economy ==
- International Monetary Fund: Income per capita in purchasing power parity ranked 17 out of 187 (2014)
- United Nations Development Programme: Human Development Index ranked 12 out of 187 (2014)
- Gallup World Poll: happiness ranked 4 out of 155 (2009)
- World Economic Forum: Global Competitiveness Report ranked 10 out of 144 (2014-2015)
- World Intellectual Property Organization: Global Innovation Index 2026, ranked 2 out of 139 countries

== Military ==
- Institute for Economics and Peace: Global Peace Index ranked 10 out of 144 (2010)

== Politics ==
- Transparency International: Corruption Perceptions Index ranked 4 out of 180 (2010)
- Reporters Without Borders: Press Freedom Index ranked 1 out of 178 (2010)
- The Economist: Democracy Index ranked 4 out of 167 (2010)
