= Ballangen Municipality =

Former municipality in Nordland, Norway

Ballangen Municipality Ballangen kommune
- Former municipality
- Flag Coat of arms

- Nordland within Norway

- Ballangen within Nordland
- Coordinates: 68°18′23″N 16°44′39″E
- Country: Norway
- County: Nordland
- District: Ofoten
- Established: 1 July 1925
  - Preceded by: Evenes Municipality
- Disestablished: 1 Jan 2020
  - Succeeded by: Narvik Municipality
- Administrative centre: Ballangen

Government
  - Mayor (2015-2020): Per Kristian Arntzen (Sp)

Area (upon dissolution)
  - Total: 932.22 km^{2} (359.93 sq mi)
  - Land: 846.38 km^{2} (326.79 sq mi)
  - Water: 85.84 km^{2} (33.14 sq mi) 9.2%
  - Rank: #119 in Norway
- Highest elevation: 1,724 m (5,656 ft)

Population (2019)
  - Total: 2,470
  - Rank: #292 in Norway
  - Density: 2.6/km^{2} (6.7/sq mi)
  - Change (10 years): ▼ −5.8%
- Demonym: Ballangsværing

Official language
  - Norwegian form: Bokmål
- Time zone: UTC+01:00 (CET)
  - Summer (DST): UTC+02:00 (CEST)
- ISO 3166 code: NO-1854

Ballangen (Northern Sami: Bálák) is a former municipality in Nordland county, Norway. The municipality existed from 1925 until its dissolution in 2020 when it became part of Narvik Municipality. The 932-square-kilometre (360 sq mi) municipality was part of the traditional district of Ofoten. The administrative centre of the municipality was the village of Ballangen. Other villages in the municipality included Bjørkåsen, Kjeldebotn, Kobbvika, and Skarstad.

Prior to its dissolution in 2020, the 932-square-kilometre (360 sq mi) municipality was the 119th largest by area out of the 422 municipalities in Norway. Ballangen Municipality was the 292nd most populous municipality in Norway with a population of 2,470. The municipality's population density was 2.6 inhabitants per square kilometre (6.7/sq mi) and its population had decreased by 5.8% over the previous 10-year period.

The municipality bordered Narvik Municipality to the east and Tysfjord Municipality to the south, and had a short border with Sweden to the southeast. Ballangen was situated on the southern shore of Ofotfjorden. Ballangen also included the long and narrow Efjorden, just south of the much larger Ofotfjorden. Its immediate surroundings were dominated by fjords, mountains, and forests. Ballangen relied on the nearby town of Narvik as its economic base.

== General information ==
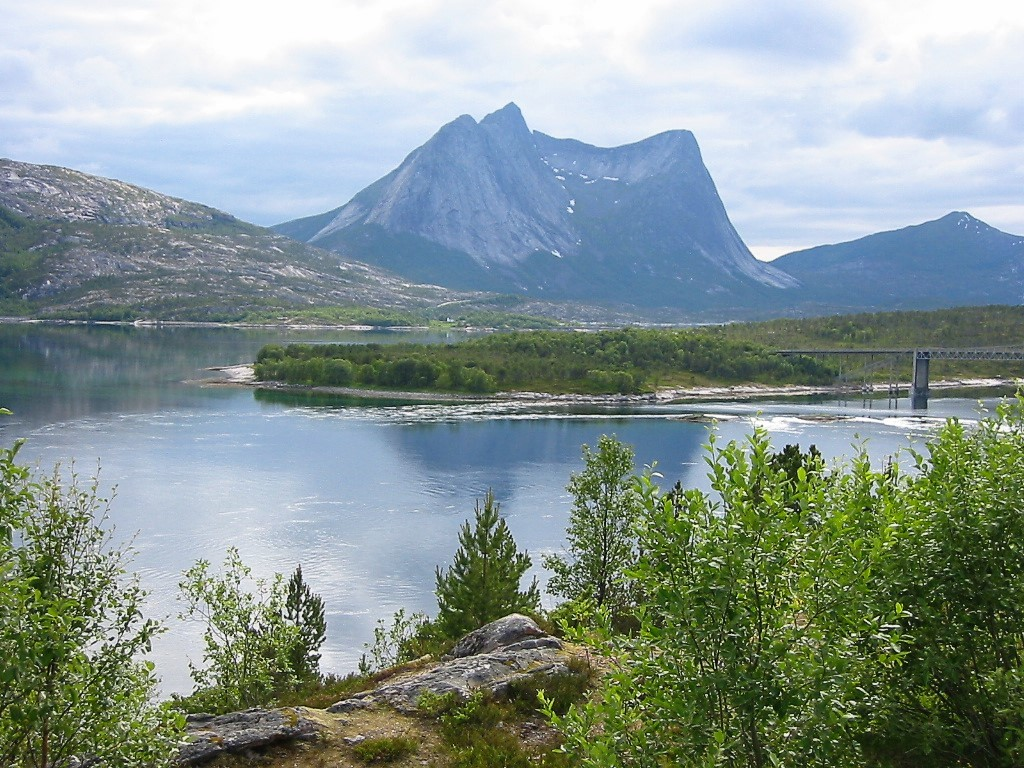
Efjord in Ballangen July 2003. The bridge is part of the E6 road.

The municipality of Ballangen was established on 1 July 1925 when it was separated from the large Evenes Municipality. The new municipality encompassed all of the area of Evenes Municipality that was located south of the Ofotfjorden. Initially, Ballangen had 3,270 residents.

During the 1960s, there were many municipal mergers across Norway due to the work of the Schei Committee. On 1 January 1962, the southern part of Lødingen Municipality (the island of Barøya and the area surrounding the Efjorden; population: 433) was transferred from Lødingen Municipality to Ballangen Municipality.

On 1 January 2020, the municipality was merged with the neighboring Narvik Municipality and the eastern half of Tysfjord Municipality to form a new, larger Narvik Municipality. This decision had been reached in 2017 after national and local discussions involving municipal mergers.

=== Coat of arms ===
The coat of arms was granted on 18 July 1980 and it was in use until 1 January 2020 when the municipality was dissolved. The official blazon is "Vert, a hammer Or in pale" (Norwegian: På grønn bunn en gull opprett hammer). This means the arms have a green field (background) and the charge is an upright hammer. The hammer has a tincture of Or which means it is commonly colored yellow, but if it is made out of metal, then gold is used. The green color in the field symbolizes the importance of agriculture and the hammer was chosen to represent mining in the municipality. There used to be copper mines in the municipality. The arms were designed by Hallvard Trætteberg.

=== Name ===
The municipality is named after the old Ballangen farm (Old Norse: Bagangr) which is located at the head of a small fjord with the same name. The first element is bag which has an unknown meaning. The last element is angr which means "fjord".

=== Churches ===
The Church of Norway had one parish (sokn) within Ballangen Municipality. It was part of the Ofoten prosti (deanery) in the Diocese of Sør-Hålogaland.

Churches in Ballangen Municipality
Parish (sokn)	Church name	Location of the church	Year built
Ballangen	Ballangen Church	Ballangen	1923
Ballangen	Efjord Chapel	Kobbvika	1985
Ballangen	Kjeldebotn Church	Kjeldebotn	1956

== History and economy ==
The first person living in Ballangen was Lodve Lange (Lodve the long), who is mentioned in Heimskringla as being one of King Olav Tryggvason's most trusted warriors, and being placed near the king in the famous ship Ormen Lange (long serpent). Lodve probably participated in the Battle of Svolder in the year 1000, and might have been killed there. He lived at Saltvik, which is near the fjord, east of today's village of Ballangen.

There is a long history of mining in Ballangen, starting from the 17th century. Over the years as many as 36 mines have been operated in Ballangen, including minerals like copper, nickel and iron, zinc, manganese, and lead, but the most serious mining started in 1911 with Bjørkåsen Gruver mining mostly pyrite. Mining for nickel and olivine continued until 2002. There is also a dolomite quarry in Ballangen. Ballangen is the main agricultural municipality in the Ofoten region. The Ballangen Museum is located in the village of Bjørkåsen in the municipality and presents the local mining history.

Ballangen has the dubious distinction of having Norway's highest rate of sick leave from work, probably due to the high number of people who worked in the mines there, and related environmental effects.

== Government ==
While it existed, Ballangen Municipality was responsible for primary education (through 10th grade), outpatient health services, senior citizen services, welfare and other social services, zoning, economic development, and municipal roads and utilities. The municipality was governed by a municipal council of directly elected representatives. The mayor was indirectly elected by a vote of the municipal council. The municipality was under the jurisdiction of the Ofoten District Court and the Hålogaland Court of Appeal.

=== Municipal council ===
The municipal council (Kommunestyre) of Ballangen Municipality was made up of 17 representatives that were elected to four year terms. The tables below show the historical composition of the council by political party.

Ballangen kommunestyre 2015–2019
Party name (in Norwegian)	Number of representatives
Labour Party (Arbeiderpartiet)	5
Progress Party (Fremskrittspartiet)	2
Conservative Party (Høyre)	2
Christian Democratic Party (Kristelig Folkeparti)	1
Centre Party (Senterpartiet)	7
Total number of members:	17
Note: On 1 January 2020, Ballangen Municipality became part of Narvik Municipality.

Ballangen kommunestyre 2011–2015
Party name (in Norwegian)	Number of representatives
Labour Party (Arbeiderpartiet)	4
Progress Party (Fremskrittspartiet)	2
Conservative Party (Høyre)	6
Christian Democratic Party (Kristelig Folkeparti)	1
Centre Party (Senterpartiet)	4
Total number of members:	17

Ballangen kommunestyre 2007–2011
Party name (in Norwegian)	Number of representatives
Labour Party (Arbeiderpartiet)	4
Progress Party (Fremskrittspartiet)	4
Conservative Party (Høyre)	3
Christian Democratic Party (Kristelig Folkeparti)	2
Centre Party (Senterpartiet)	4
Total number of members:	17

Ballangen kommunestyre 2003–2007
Party name (in Norwegian)	Number of representatives
Labour Party (Arbeiderpartiet)	4
Progress Party (Fremskrittspartiet)	3
Centre Party (Senterpartiet)	7
Joint list of the Conservative Party (Høyre) and Christian Democratic Party (Kristelig Folkeparti)	3
Total number of members:	17

Ballangen kommunestyre 1999–2003
Party name (in Norwegian)	Number of representatives
Labour Party (Arbeiderpartiet)	6
Centre Party (Senterpartiet)	4
Joint list of the Conservative Party (Høyre), Christian Democratic Party (Kristelig Folkeparti), and Liberal Party (Venstre)	7
Total number of members:	17

Ballangen kommunestyre 1995–1999
Party name (in Norwegian)	Number of representatives
Labour Party (Arbeiderpartiet)	9
Conservative Party (Høyre)	6
Christian Democratic Party (Kristelig Folkeparti)	2
Centre Party (Senterpartiet)	5
Socialist Left Party (Sosialistisk Venstreparti)	1
Total number of members:	23

Ballangen kommunestyre 1991–1995
Party name (in Norwegian)	Number of representatives
Labour Party (Arbeiderpartiet)	8
Conservative Party (Høyre)	5
Christian Democratic Party (Kristelig Folkeparti)	2
Centre Party (Senterpartiet)	6
Socialist Left Party (Sosialistisk Venstreparti)	2
Total number of members:	23

Ballangen kommunestyre 1987–1991
Party name (in Norwegian)	Number of representatives
Labour Party (Arbeiderpartiet)	12
Conservative Party (Høyre)	4
Christian Democratic Party (Kristelig Folkeparti)	2
Centre Party (Senterpartiet)	3
Socialist Left Party (Sosialistisk Venstreparti)	2
Total number of members:	23

Ballangen kommunestyre 1983–1987
Party name (in Norwegian)	Number of representatives
Labour Party (Arbeiderpartiet)	11
Conservative Party (Høyre)	2
Christian Democratic Party (Kristelig Folkeparti)	2
Centre Party (Senterpartiet)	8
Total number of members:	23

Ballangen kommunestyre 1979–1983
Party name (in Norwegian)	Number of representatives
Labour Party (Arbeiderpartiet)	11
Conservative Party (Høyre)	4
Christian Democratic Party (Kristelig Folkeparti)	3
Centre Party (Senterpartiet)	4
Joint list of the Liberal Party and Free Voters (Venstre og Frie velgere)	1
Total number of members:	23

Ballangen kommunestyre 1975–1979
Party name (in Norwegian)	Number of representatives
Labour Party (Arbeiderpartiet)	13
Conservative Party (Høyre)	3
Centre Party (Senterpartiet)	4
Non-socialist common list (Ikkesosialistisk fellesliste)	3
Total number of members:	23

Ballangen kommunestyre 1971–1975
Party name (in Norwegian)	Number of representatives
Labour Party (Arbeiderpartiet)	13
Conservative Party (Høyre)	2
Centre Party (Senterpartiet)	6
Socialist People's Party (Sosialistisk Folkeparti)	1
Liberal Party (Venstre)	1
Total number of members:	23

Ballangen kommunestyre 1967–1971
Party name (in Norwegian)	Number of representatives
Labour Party (Arbeiderpartiet)	13
Conservative Party (Høyre)	2
Centre Party (Senterpartiet)	4
Liberal Party (Venstre)	3
Local List(s) (Lokale lister)	1
Total number of members:	23

Ballangen kommunestyre 1963–1967
Party name (in Norwegian)	Number of representatives
Labour Party (Arbeiderpartiet)	13
Conservative Party (Høyre)	2
Centre Party (Senterpartiet)	4
Liberal Party (Venstre)	3
Local List(s) (Lokale lister)	1
Total number of members:	23

Ballangen herredsstyre 1959–1963
Party name (in Norwegian)	Number of representatives
Labour Party (Arbeiderpartiet)	10
Communist Party (Kommunistiske Parti)	1
Joint List(s) of Non-Socialist Parties (Borgerlige Felleslister)	10
Total number of members:	21

Ballangen herredsstyre 1955–1959
Party name (in Norwegian)	Number of representatives
Labour Party (Arbeiderpartiet)	9
Communist Party (Kommunistiske Parti)	2
Joint List(s) of Non-Socialist Parties (Borgerlige Felleslister)	5
Local List(s) (Lokale lister)	5
Total number of members:	21

Ballangen herredsstyre 1951–1955
Party name (in Norwegian)	Number of representatives
Labour Party (Arbeiderpartiet)	7
Communist Party (Kommunistiske Parti)	3
Local List(s) (Lokale lister)	11
Total number of members:	21

Ballangen herredsstyre 1947–1951
Party name (in Norwegian)	Number of representatives
Labour Party (Arbeiderpartiet)	8
Communist Party (Kommunistiske Parti)	4
Joint List(s) of Non-Socialist Parties (Borgerlige Felleslister)	9
Total number of members:	21

Ballangen herredsstyre 1945–1947
Party name (in Norwegian)	Number of representatives
Labour Party (Arbeiderpartiet)	8
Communist Party (Kommunistiske Parti)	3
Local List(s) (Lokale lister)	10
Total number of members:	21

Ballangen herredsstyre 1937–1941*
Party name (in Norwegian)	Number of representatives
Labour Party (Arbeiderpartiet)	8
Joint List(s) of Non-Socialist Parties (Borgerlige Felleslister)	7
Local List(s) (Lokale lister)	1
Total number of members:	16
Note: Due to the German occupation of Norway during World War II, no elections were held for new municipal councils until after the war ended in 1945.

=== Mayors ===
The mayor (Norwegian: ordfører) of Ballangen Municipality was the political leader of the municipality and the chairperson of the municipal council. Here is a list of people who held this position:

- 1925–1929: John Magnus Østvik (Bp)
- 1930–1931: Lorentz Andreas Benjaminsen (Bp)
- 1932–1934: Gunnar Carlsen (V)
- 1935–1938: Nils Rognli Grande (Ap)
- 1939–1941: Harald Strømsnes (LL)
- 1941–1942: John Magnus Østvik (Bp)
- 1943–1945: Oskar Hole (NS)
- 1945–1946: Harald Strømsnes (LL)
- 1946–1947: Peder Andreas Eriksen (Ap)
- 1948–1951: Kador Johansen (Ap)
- 1952–1956: John Magnus Østvik (Bp)
- 1956–1961: Leif Rødseth (Ap)
- 1962–1963: Atle-Rolv Dahl (V)
- 1964–1967: Agnar Bjørkseth (Ap)
- 1967–1976: Ansgar Dahl (Ap)
- 1976–1979: Bjarne Jakobsen (Ap)
- 1979–1987: Kolbjørn Dahlin (Sp)
- 1987–1991: Knut Knutsen (Ap)
- 1991–1993: Asmund Dybvand (Sp)
- 1993–1999: Ivar Skoglund (H)
- 1999–1999: Per Kristian Arntzen (Sp)
- 1999–2003: Einar Gabrielsen (H)
- 2003–2007: Per Kristian Arntzen (Sp)
- 2007–2015: Anne-Rita Nicklasson (H)
- 2015–2020: Per Kristian Arntzen (Sp)

== Geography ==
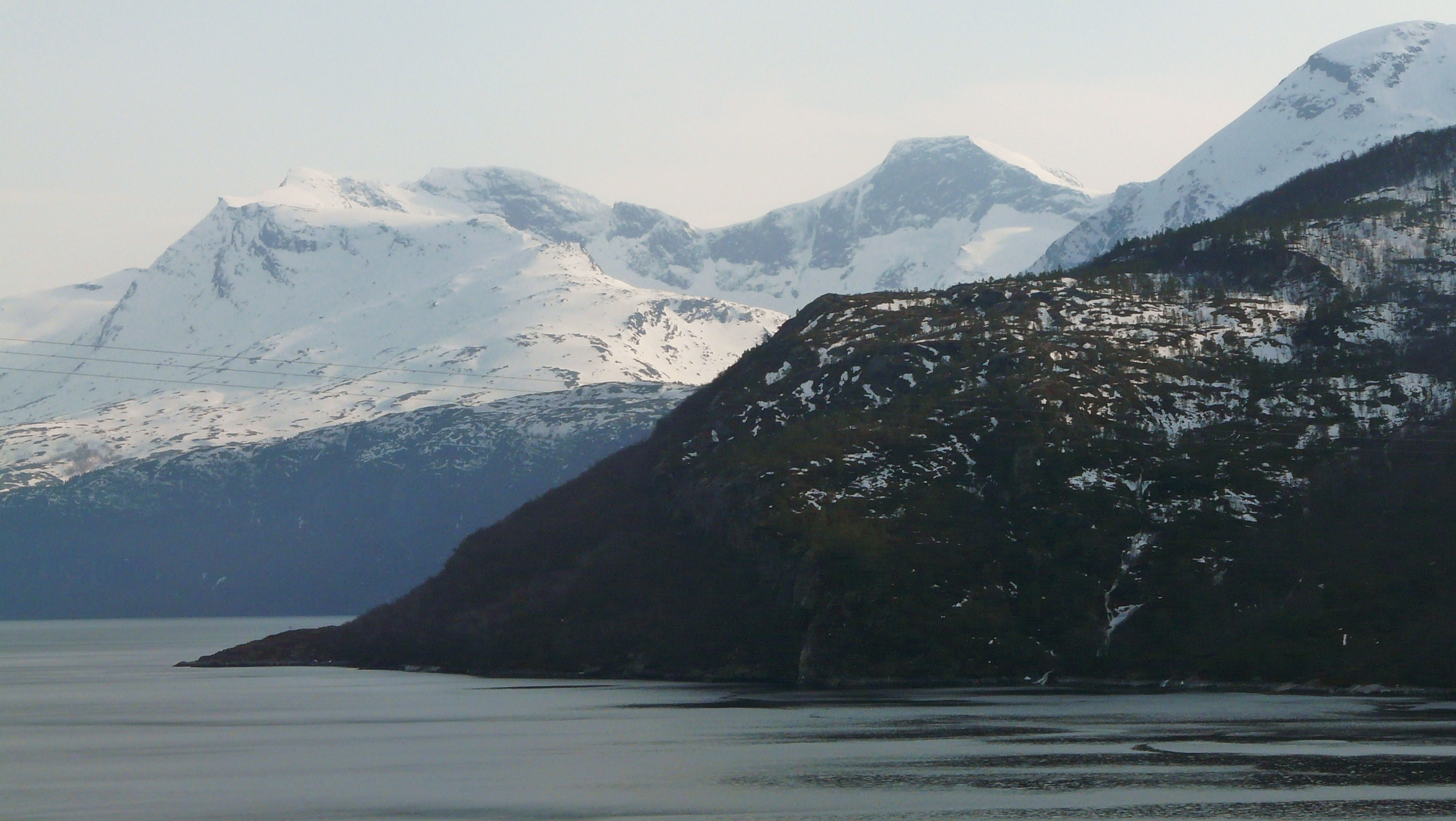
View of the Frostisen glacier

The village of Ballangen lies along the southern shore of the Ofotfjorden along the European route E6 highway. The highway crosses the Efjord Bridges on its way to Ballangen and then on again to the town of Narvik.

The Efjorden area is dominated by large slopes of bare rock with a narrow green area of vegetation near the fjord. The obelisk-like mountain, Stetind, nearby is dominated by the same, dark blue-grey rock, which contrasts with the clear water in the fjord where the sand banks can be seen just below the surface. Climbers and hikers are often tempted to test their skills on the rocky slopes. The large Frostisen glacier is located in the southeastern part of the municipality. The highest point in the municipality was the 1,724-metre (5,656 ft) tall mountain Frostisen.

In the east, Ballangen bordered on lake Siiddašjávri which it shares with Sweden. Siiddašjávri is the 14th largest lake which lies in or partially in Norway. Other lakes in the municipality included Børsvatnet, Geitvatnet, Hjertvatnet, Kjelvatnet, Langvatnet, Melkevatnet, Røvatnet, Søre Bukkevatnet, and Storvatnet.

The island of Barøya sits near the entrances to the Efjorden from the Ofotfjorden. The Barøy Lighthouse sits on the northern edge of the island.

== Notable people ==
- Anni-Frid Lyngstad, a singer in the group ABBA who was born in Ballangen
- Geir Bratland, a musician in Apoptygma Berzerk, Dimmu Borgir, God Seed, The Kovenant, and Satyricon (band) was born and raised in Ballangen

== Sister cities ==
- Tosno, Leningrad Oblast, Russia

== See also ==
- List of former municipalities of Norway
