= Kobbvika =

Village in Narvik Municipality, Norway

- Village
- Interactive map of Kobbvika
- Location within Nordland Location within Norway
- Coordinates: 68.3350°N 16.3471°E
- Country: Norway
- Region: Northern Norway
- County: Nordland
- District: Ofoten
- Municipality: Narvik Municipality
- Elevation: 8 m (26 ft)
- Time zone: UTC+01:00 (CET)
  - Summer (DST): UTC+02:00 (CEST)
- Post Code: 8540 Ballangen

Kobbvika is a village in Narvik Municipality in Nordland county, Norway. The village is located near the mouth of the Efjorden, about 10 kilometres (6.2 mi) northwest of the Efjord Bridges, and about 20 kilometres (12 mi) west of the village of Ballangen. The island of Barøya lies about 7 kilometres (4.3 mi) west of the village. Efjord Chapel is located in this village.
