= Røvatnet =

Lake in Nordland, Norway

- Interactive map of the lake
- Location: Nordland, Norway
- Coordinates: 68.2076°N 16.8928°E
- Basin countries: Norway
- Max. length: 1.6 kilometres (0.99 mi)
- Max. width: 900 metres (3,000 ft)
- Surface area: 1 km^{2} (0.39 sq mi)
- Shore length^{1}: 5.7 kilometres (3.5 mi)
- Surface elevation: 472 metres (1,549 ft)
- References: NVE
- ^{1} Shore length is not a well-defined measure.

Røvatnet is a lake in Narvik Municipality in Nordland county, Norway. Røvatnet lake is located at an elevation of 472 metres (1,549 ft) above sea level and it is part of the river system that drains the lakes: Røvatnet, Sennvatnet, Skårvatnet, Hjertvatnet, Melkevatnet, Djupvatnet, Grunnvatnet, Børsvatnet, and Forsåvatnet. The Røvatnet lake supports a population of Arctic char. It is sometimes possible to do ice fishing at this lake as late as June. Røvatnet is located on Norwegian state property and therefore fishing at this site is open to the public.

== See also ==
- List of lakes in Norway
