= Kjelvatnet =

Kjelvatnet may refer to:

== Places ==
- Kjelvatnet (Fauske), a lake in Fauske Municipality in Nordland county, Norway
- Kjelvatnet (Finnmark), a lake in Gamvik Municipality in Finnark county, Norway
- Kjelvatnet (Hattfjelldal), a lake in Hattfjelldal Municipality in Nordland county, Norway
- Kjelvatnet (Narvik), a lake in Narvik Municipality in Nordland county, Norway
