= Kjeldebotn =

Village in Narvik Municipality, Norway

Kjeldebotn (Norwegian) Gáldovuotna (Northern Sami)
- Village
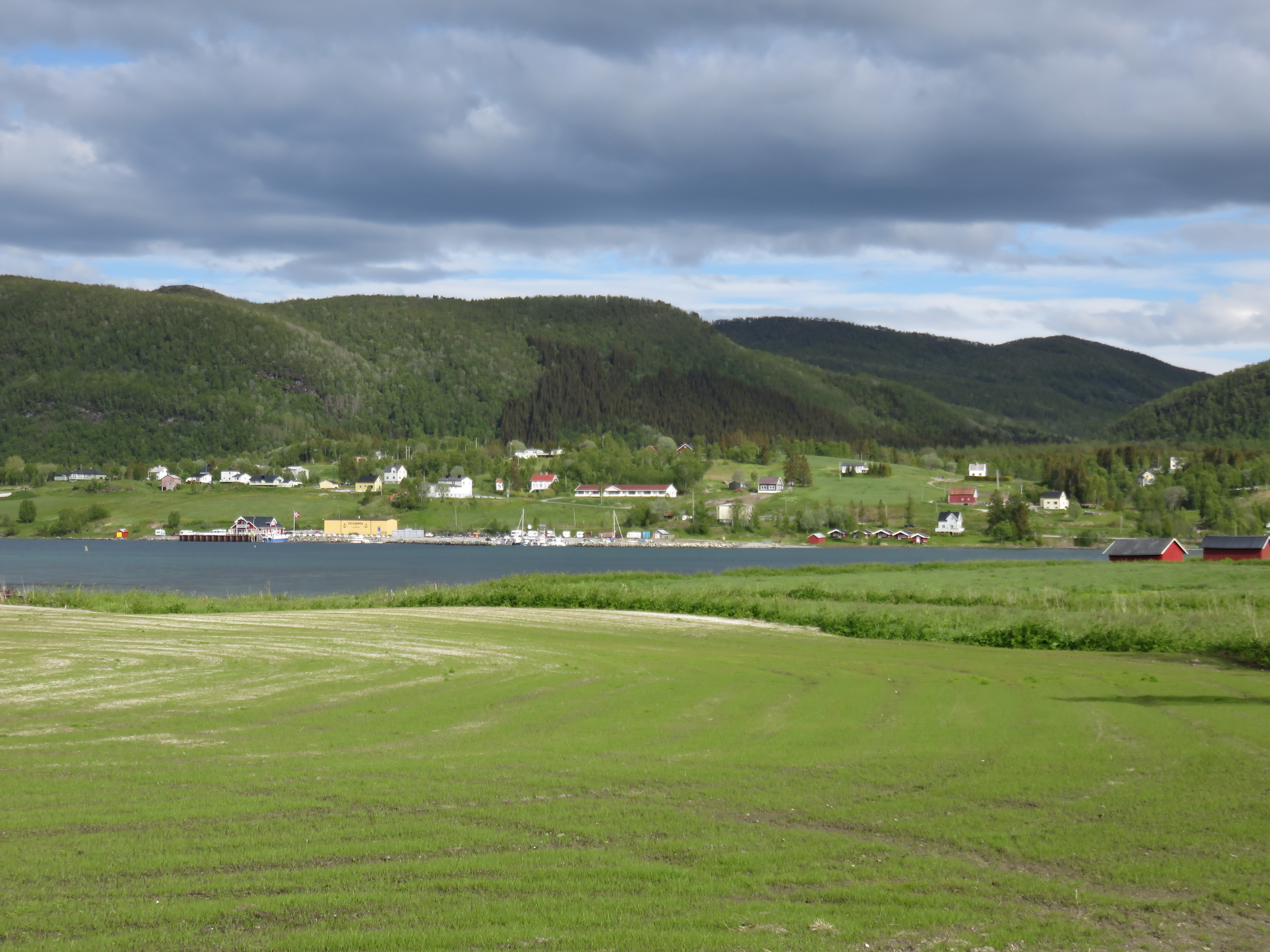
- View of the village
- Interactive map of Kjeldebotn (Norwegian); Gáldovuotna (Northern Sami)
- Location within Nordland Location within Norway
- Coordinates: 68.4064°N 16.6561°E
- Country: Norway
- Region: Northern Norway
- County: Nordland
- District: Ofoten
- Municipality: Narvik Municipality
- Elevation: 4 m (13 ft)
- Time zone: UTC+01:00 (CET)
  - Summer (DST): UTC+02:00 (CEST)
- Post Code: 8543 Kjeldebotn

Kjeldebotn (Norwegian) or Gáldovuotna (Northern Sami) is a village in Narvik Municipality in Nordland county, Norway. The village is located on the southern shore of the Ofotfjorden, about 15 kilometres (9.3 mi) northwest of the village of Ballangen. Kjeldebotn Church is located in Kjeldebotn.
