= Ballangen Church =

Church in Nordland, Norway

- Ballangen kirke
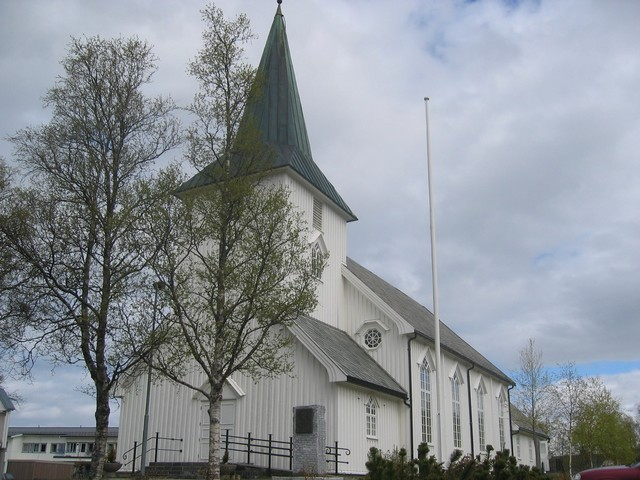
- View of the church
- Ballangen Church
- 68.3396157°N 16.8205806°E
- Location: Narvik Municipality, Nordland
- Country: Norway
- Denomination: Church of Norway
- Churchmanship: Evangelical Lutheran

History
- Status: Parish church
- Founded: 1923
- Consecrated: 6 June 1923

Architecture
- Functional status: Active
- Architect: Høyer Ellefsen
- Architectural type: Long church
- Completed: 1923 (103 years ago)

Specifications
- Capacity: 280
- Materials: Wood

Administration
- Diocese: Sør-Hålogaland
- Deanery: Ofoten prosti
- Parish: Ballangen
- Norwegian Cultural Heritage Site
- Type: Church
- Status: Not protected
- ID: 83846

Ballangen Church (Norwegian: Ballangen kirke) is a parish church of the Church of Norway in Narvik Municipality in Nordland county, Norway. It is located in the village of Ballangen. It is one of the churches for the Ballangen parish which is part of the Ofoten prosti (deanery) in the Diocese of Sør-Hålogaland. The white, wooden church was built in a long church style in 1923 using plans drawn up by the architect Høyer Ellefsen. The church seats about 280 people. The building was consecrated on 6 June 1923 by Bishop Johan Støren. The church holds worship services two or three Sundays each month.

== Media gallery ==
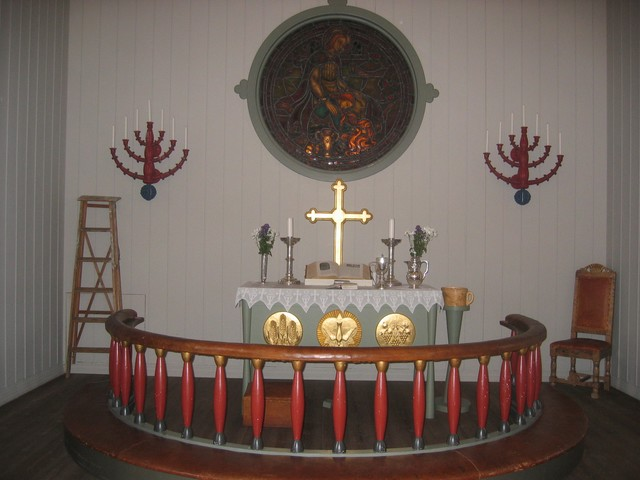

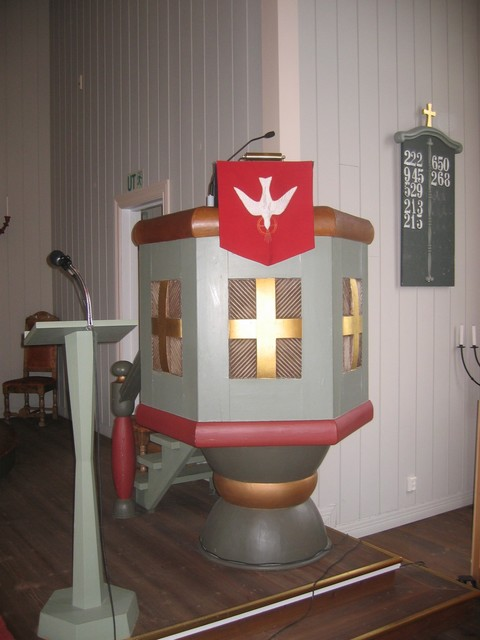

== See also ==
- List of churches in Sør-Hålogaland
