= Theodor Broch =

Norwegian lawyer and politician

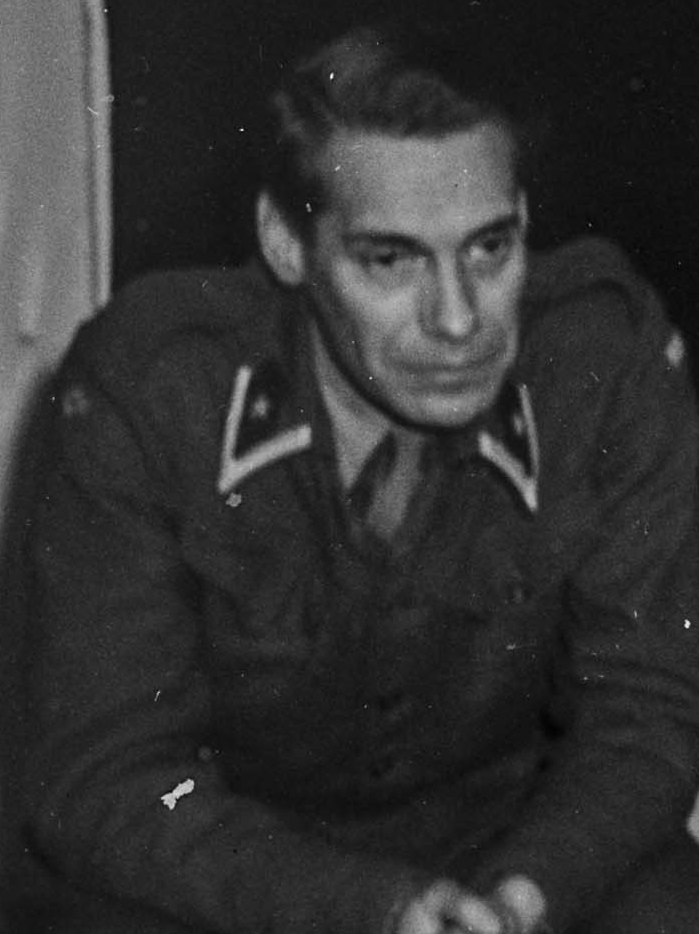
Photos from Flickr album (The Evacuation and Liberation of Finnmark, 2015)

Peter Theodor Broch (27 January 1904 – 26 April 1998) was a Norwegian lawyer and politician for the Labour Party.

He was born in Kristiania as a son of Colonel Ole Jacob Broch (1875–1963) and housewife Henny Salvesen (1877–1957). He was a brother of the professor of medicine, Ole Jacob Broch (1907–1995). He enrolled as a student in 1922. He participated in the Left Communist Youth League's military strike action of 1924. He was convicted for assisting in this crime and sentenced to 90 days of probation. He graduated with the cand.jur. degree in 1928, and worked as an attorney in Oslo from 1929 to 1930. He had been a writer for the periodical Mot Dag from 1923 to 1930. From 1930 to 1940 and 1945 to 1950, he worked as an attorney in Narvik.

He was the mayor of Narvik Municipality from 1934 to 1946, except for the period 1940 to 1945 when Norway was occupied by Germany. He was exiled in the United States and United Kingdom during that period and participated in World War II. He was issued the Defence Medal 1940–1945 in 1945, the Légion d'honneur in 1946, and the Order of the British Empire in 1975.

After the war, he became a member of the Schei Committee from 1946 to 1950. He was elected to the Norwegian Parliament from the Market towns of Nordland, Troms and Finnmark in 1945, but was not re-elected in 1949. He was then appointed chief administrative officer (rådmann) in Tønsberg Municipality, staying in that position until 1973. He then became a lawyer for so-called "alien workers" in Oslo. He was a member of Gamle Oslo borough council from 1976 to 1980, and in 1978, he founded the Norwegian-Pakistani Association, being its first chairman from 1978 to 1981. He was also a board member of the Norwegian Bar Association from 1945 to 1949 and of Gjensidige.

He was the father of Supreme Court Justice Lars Oftedal Broch. He died in April 1998.
