= Storvatnet (Narvik) =

Lake in Nordland, Norway

Storvatnet (Norwegian) Ránujávri (Northern Sami)
- Historic spelling: Ranojavri (Northern Sami)
- Interactive map of the lake
- Location: Nordland, Norway
- Coordinates: 68.3096°N 17.0439°E
- Basin countries: Norway
- Max. length: 9 kilometres (5.6 mi)
- Max. width: 1.8 kilometres (1.1 mi)
- Surface area: 9.76 km^{2} (3.77 sq mi)
- Shore length^{1}: 19.26 kilometres (11.97 mi)
- Surface elevation: 15 metres (49 ft)
- References: NVE
- ^{1} Shore length is not a well-defined measure.

Storvatnet (Norwegian) or Ránujávri (Northern Sami) is a lake in Narvik Municipality in Nordland county, Norway. The 9.76-square-kilometre (3.77 sq mi) lake is located about 8 kilometres (5.0 mi) east of the village of Ballangen.

== See also ==
- List of lakes in Norway
