= Langvatnet (Ballangen) =

Lake in Nordland, Norway

Langvatnet (Norwegian) Guovddelisjávrre (Northern Sami)
- Historic spellings: Guovdelasjávri or Guovddelasjávrre (Northern Sami)
- Interactive map of the lake
- Location: Nordland, Norway
- Coordinates: 68.3733°N 16.6486°E
- Basin countries: Norway
- Max. length: 8.5 kilometres (5.3 mi)
- Max. width: 3.6 kilometres (2.2 mi)
- Surface area: 14.36 km^{2} (5.54 sq mi)
- Shore length^{1}: 36.66 kilometres (22.78 mi)
- Surface elevation: 674 metres (2,211 ft)
- References: NVE
- ^{1} Shore length is not a well-defined measure.

Langvatnet (Norwegian) or Guovddelisjávrre (Northern Sami) is a lake in Narvik Municipality in Nordland county, Norway. The 14.36-square-kilometre (5.54 sq mi) lake is located northwest of the lake Sijdasjávrre and south of the lake Geitvatnet, about 3 kilometres (1.9 mi) from the border with Sweden.

== See also ==
- List of lakes in Norway
