= Efjord Chapel =

Church in Nordland, Norway

- Efjord kapell
- Efjord Chapel
- 68.33171955°N 16.3588523°E
- Location: Narvik Municipality, Nordland
- Country: Norway
- Denomination: Church of Norway
- Churchmanship: Evangelical Lutheran

History
- Status: Chapel
- Founded: 1985
- Consecrated: 17 November 1985

Architecture
- Functional status: Active
- Architect: Elund Leiros
- Architectural type: Long church
- Completed: 1985 (41 years ago)

Specifications
- Capacity: 75
- Materials: Wood

Administration
- Diocese: Sør-Hålogaland
- Deanery: Ofoten prosti
- Parish: Ballangen

Efjord Chapel (Norwegian: Efjord kapell) is a chapel of the Church of Norway in Narvik Municipality in Nordland county, Norway. It is located in the village of Kobbvika. It is an annex chapel in the Ballangen parish which is part of the Ofoten prosti (deanery) in the Diocese of Sør-Hålogaland. The white, wooden chapel was built in a long church style in 1985 using plans drawn up by the architect Elund Leiros. The chapel seats about 75 people. The chapel holds at least six worship services each year.

== See also ==
- List of churches in Sør-Hålogaland
