= Frostisen =

Glacier in Nordland, Norway

Frostisen (Norwegian); Ruostajiekŋa (Northern Sami)
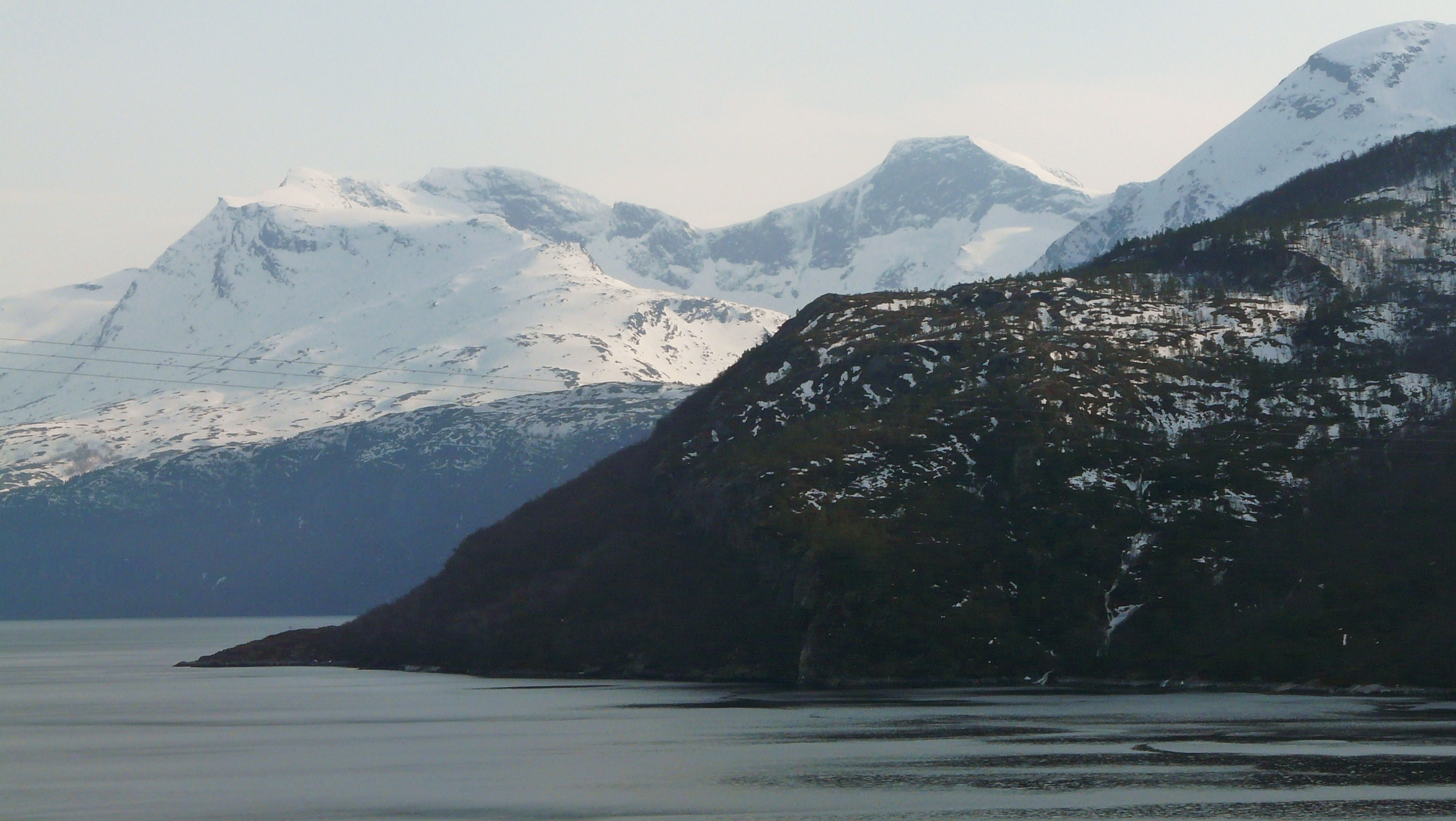
- Frostisen mountains seen from the fjord
- Interactive map of: Frostisen (Norwegian); Ruostajiekŋa (Northern Sami)
- Type: Plateau glacier
- Location: Narvik Municipality, Nordland, Norway
- Coordinates: 68.2343°N 17.1848°E
- Area: 25 km^{2} (9.7 sq mi)
- Highest elevation: 1,710 metres (5,610 ft)
- Lowest elevation: 840 metres (2,760 ft)

Frostisen (Norwegian) or Ruostajiekŋa (Northern Sami) is a glacier in Narvik Municipality in Nordland county, Norway. It is one of the larger plateau glaciers in Norway. Frostisen covers an area of about 25 square kilometres (9.7 sq mi), and its elevation ranges from 840 to 1,710 metres (2,760 to 5,610 ft) above sea level. The glacier lies near the Skjomen fjord, a branch of the Ofotfjorden, just southwest of the town of Narvik. The village of Elvegård lies about 6 kilometres (3.7 mi) east of the glacier. The lakes Geitvatnet, Isvatnet, Kjelvatnet, Nordre Bukkevatnet and Søre Bukkevatnet lie southwest of the glacier.

== See also ==
- List of glaciers in Norway
