= Hjertvatnet =

Lake in Nordland, Norway

Hjertvatnet (Norwegian) Vájmmojávrre (Lule Sami)
- Historic spelling: Vájmmojávvre (Lule Sami)
- Interactive map of the lake
- Location: Nordland, Norway
- Coordinates: 68.2259°N 16.8082°E
- Basin countries: Norway
- Max. length: 3.8 kilometres (2.4 mi)
- Max. width: 1 kilometre (0.62 mi)
- Surface area: 2.44 km^{2} (0.94 sq mi)
- Shore length^{1}: 11.45 kilometres (7.11 mi)
- Surface elevation: 255 metres (837 ft)
- References: NVE
- ^{1} Shore length is not a well-defined measure.

Hjertvatnet (Norwegian) or Vájmmojávrre (Lule Sami) is a lake in Narvik Municipality in Nordland county, Norway. The 2.44-square-kilometre (0.94 sq mi) lake is located between the lake Børsvatnet and the lake Melkevatnet.

== See also ==
- List of lakes in Norway
