= Anne Rydning =

Norwegian military officer (born 1965)

- Born: February 27, 1965 (age 61); Narvik, Norway
- Military career
- Allegiance: Norway
- Branch: Norwegian Army
- Rank: Brigadier General

Anne Rydning (born 27 February 1965 in Narvik, Norway) is a Brigadier General and head of department of operation management in the Norwegian army staff. Has varied military background. Academy Graduate. Has worked as a platoon and company commander at the engineer battalion Skjold. Has also worked in the Defence Logistics Organisation and the Defence Ministry. In recent years she has worked in Hærstaben (Norwegian army)

In January 2011 she took over as the first female chief of the Norwegian forces in Afghanistan.

== See also ==
- PRT Meymaneh
