= Melkevatnet =

Lake in Nordland, Norway

- Interactive map of the lake
- Location: Nordland, Norway
- Coordinates: 68.2090°N 16.7671°E
- Basin countries: Norway
- Max. length: 4 kilometres (2.5 mi)
- Max. width: 1 kilometre (0.62 mi)
- Surface area: 3.34 km^{2} (1.29 sq mi)
- Shore length^{1}: 11.86 kilometres (7.37 mi)
- Surface elevation: 94 metres (308 ft)
- References: NVE
- ^{1} Shore length is not a well-defined measure.

Melkevatnet is a lake in Narvik Municipality in Nordland county, Norway. The 3.34-square-kilometre (1.29 sq mi) lake is located between the Efjorden and the lake Hjertvatnet.

== See also ==
- List of lakes in Norway
