= Barøya =

Island in Norway

Barøya (Norwegian); Bárka (Northern Sami)
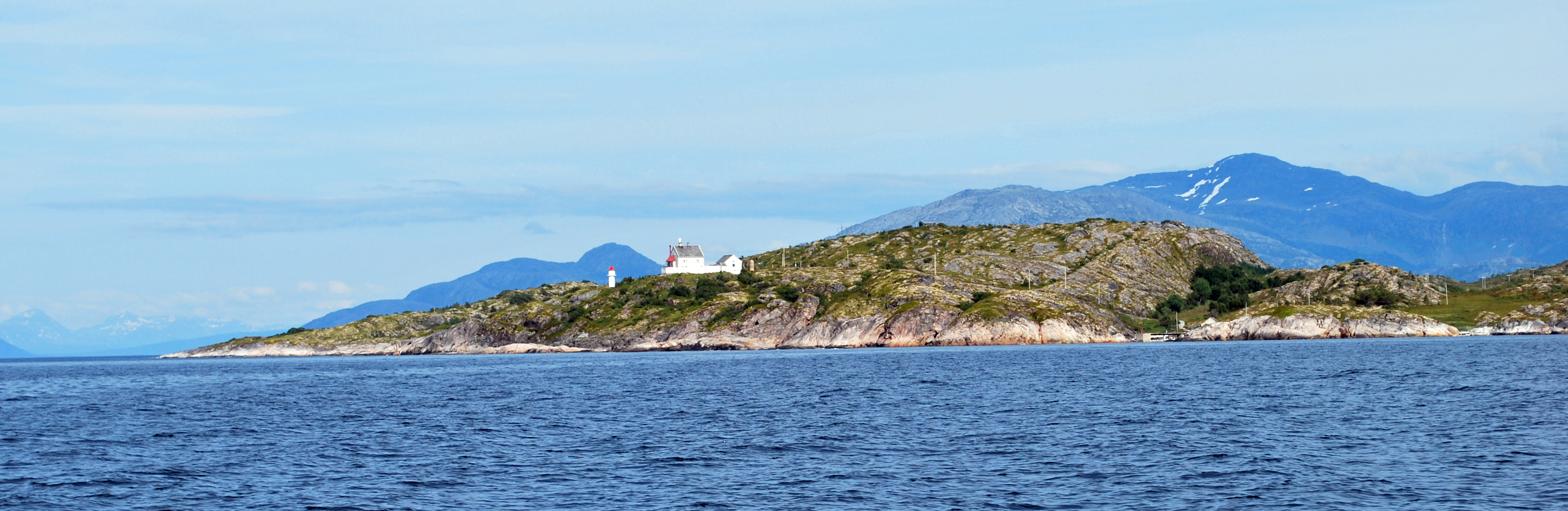
- View of the island with Barøy Lighthouse
- Interactive map of: Barøya (Norwegian); Bárka (Northern Sami)

Geography
- Location: Nordland, Norway
- Coordinates: 68.3485°N 16.1076°E
- Area: 13 km^{2} (5.0 sq mi)
- Highest elevation: 299 m (981 ft)
- Highest point: Sørfjellet

Administration
- Norway
- County: Nordland
- Municipality: Narvik Municipality

Demographics
- Population: 0 (2016)

Barøya (Norwegian) or Bárka (Northern Sami) is an uninhabited island in Narvik Municipality in Nordland county, Norway. The 13-square-kilometre (5.0 sq mi) island is located in the Ofotfjorden near the entrance to the Efjorden. The village of Lødingen lies 7 kilometres (4.3 mi) north of the island. Barøy Lighthouse is located on the northwestern part of the island. The highest point on the island is the 299-metre (981 ft) tall mountain Sørfjellet.

== See also ==
- List of islands of Norway
