= Børsvatnet =

Lake in Nordland, Norway

Børsvatnet (Norwegian) Bođatjávri (Northern Sami)
- Bådatjavri (Northern Sami) (historical)
- Interactive map of the lake
- Location: Nordland, Norway
- Coordinates: 68.2622°N 16.8706°E
- Basin countries: Norway
- Max. length: 11 kilometres (6.8 mi)
- Max. width: 2 kilometres (1.2 mi)
- Surface area: 11.6 km^{2} (4.5 sq mi)
- Shore length^{1}: 31.73 kilometres (19.72 mi)
- Surface elevation: 90 metres (300 ft)
- References: NVE
- ^{1} Shore length is not a well-defined measure.

Børsvatnet (Norwegian) or Bođatjávri (Northern Sami) is a lake in the municipality of Narvik Municipality in Nordland county, Norway. The 11.6-square-kilometre (4.5 sq mi) lake is located about 3.5 kilometres (2.2 mi) southwest of the village of Ballangen.

== See also ==
- List of lakes in Norway
