= Kjelvatnet (Narvik) =

Lake in Nordland, Norway

- Interactive map of the lake
- Location: Nordland, Norway
- Coordinates: 68.1873°N 17.1764°E
- Basin countries: Norway
- Max. length: 2.8 kilometres (1.7 mi)
- Max. width: 1.2 kilometres (0.75 mi)
- Surface area: 2.6 km^{2} (1.0 sq mi)
- Shore length^{1}: 8.48 kilometres (5.27 mi)
- Surface elevation: 829 metres (2,720 ft)
- References: NVE
- ^{1} Shore length is not a well-defined measure.

Kjelvatnet is a lake in Narvik Municipality in Nordland county, Norway. The 2.6-square-kilometre (1.0 sq mi) lake lies at an elevation of 829 metres (2,720 ft) above sea level, just south of the Frostisen glacier, near the border with Sweden.

== See also ==
- List of lakes in Norway
