= Siiddašjávri =

Lake in Sweden and Norway

Siiddašjávri (Northern Sami) Sijdasjávrre (Lule Sami) Sitasjaure (Swedish)
- Interactive map of the lake
- Location: Gällivare, Norrbottenand; Narvik, Nordland
- Coordinates: 68.0968°N 17.2287°E
- Basin countries: Sweden and Norway
- Max. length: 35 kilometres (22 mi)
- Max. width: 5 kilometres (3.1 mi)
- Surface area: 71.91 km^{2} (27.76 sq mi) (0.96 km^{2} in Norway)
- Shore length^{1}: 97.27 kilometres (60.44 mi)
- Surface elevation: 604 metres (1,982 ft)
- References: NVE
- ^{1} Shore length is not a well-defined measure.

Siiddašjávri (Northern Sami) or Sijdasjávrre (Lule Sami) or Sitasjaure (Swedish) is a lake on the border between Norway and Sweden. The lake covers an area of 71.91 square kilometres (27.76 sq mi), with 0.96 square kilometres (0.37 sq mi) of the lake in Norway (Narvik Municipality in Nordland county) and 70.95 square kilometres (27.39 sq mi) in Sweden (Gällivare Municipality in Norrbotten County). The name of the lake comes from the Sami languages, with the ending -jávri or -jávrre being the word for "lake".

== See also ==
- List of lakes in Norway
