= Narvik Municipality =

Municipality in Nordland, Norway

Narvik Municipality Narvik kommune Áhkanjárga (Northern Sami)
- Municipality
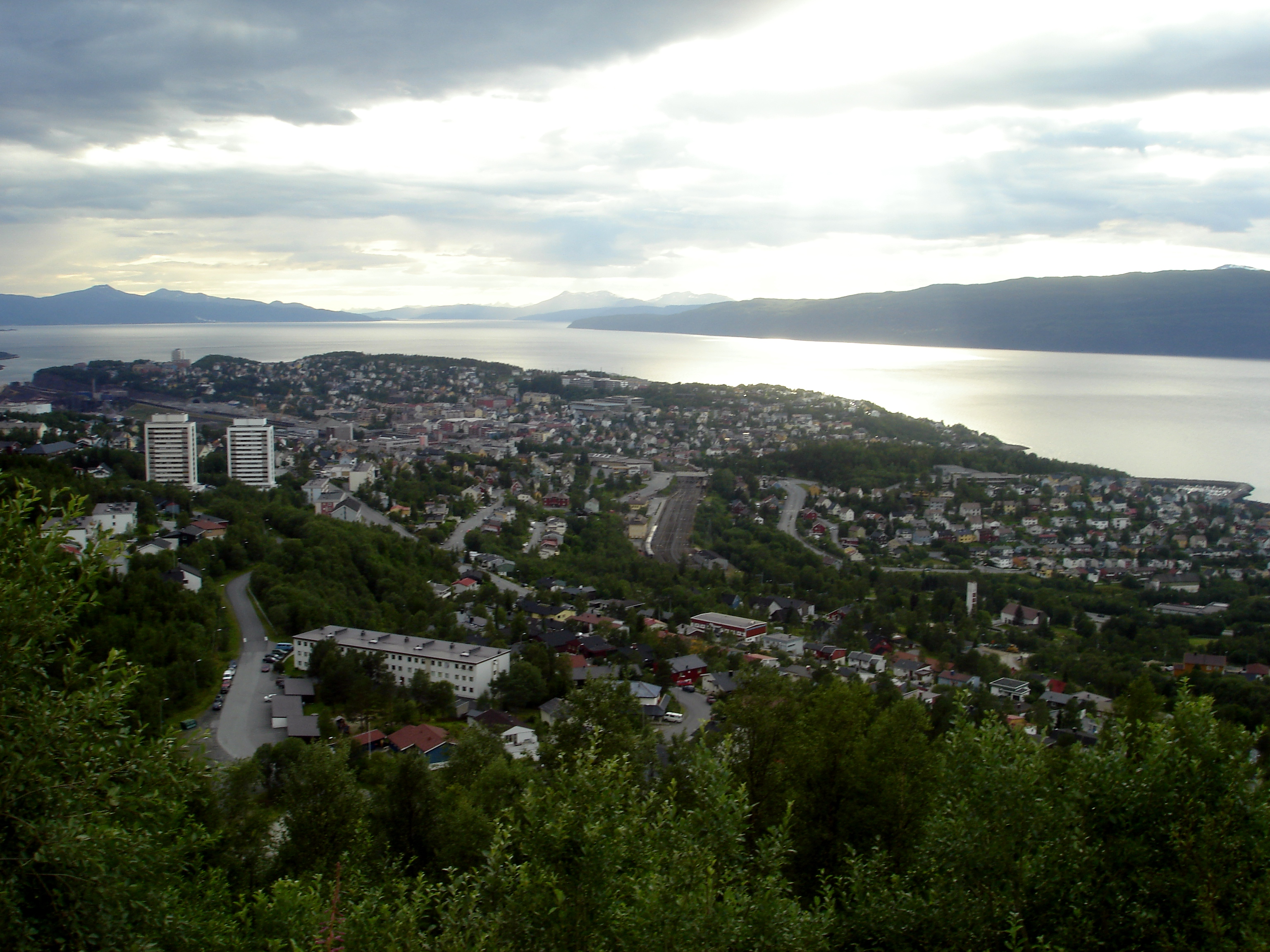
- View of Narvik

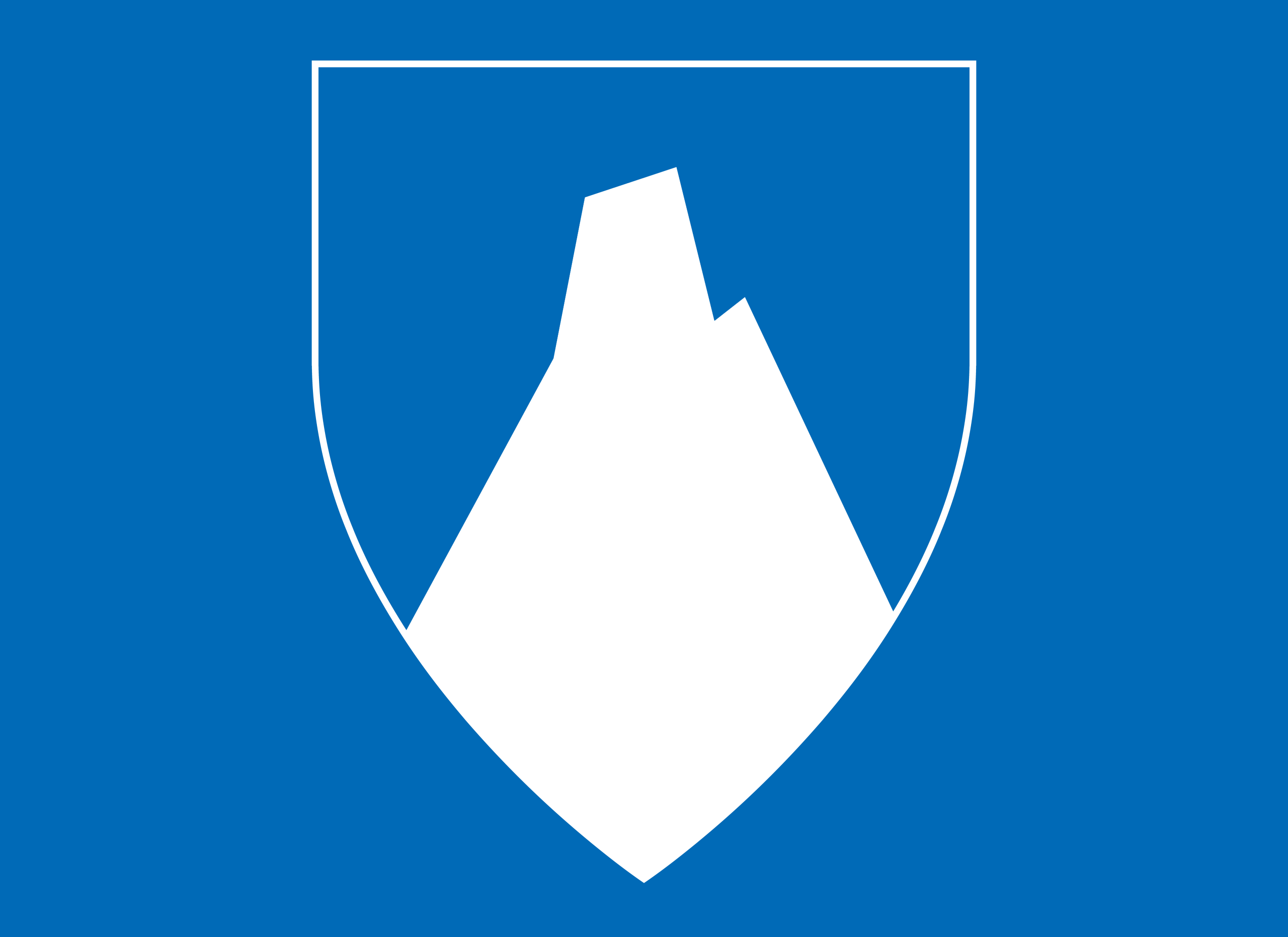
- Flag Coat of arms
- Nickname: By1
- Nordland within Norway

- Narvik within Nordland
- Coordinates: 68°25′14″N 17°33′36″E
- Country: Norway
- County: Nordland
- District: Ofoten
- Established: 1 Jan 1902
  - Preceded by: Ankenes Municipality
- Administrative centre: Narvik

Government
  - Mayor (2015): Rune Edvardsen (Ap)

Area
  - Total: 3,432.20 km^{2} (1,325.18 sq mi)
  - Land: 3,194.70 km^{2} (1,233.48 sq mi)
  - Water: 237.50 km^{2} (91.70 sq mi) 6.9%
  - Rank: #10 in Norway
- Highest elevation: 1,893.7 m (6,213 ft)

Population (2024)
  - Total: 21,580
  - Rank: #61 in Norway
  - Density: 6.3/km^{2} (16/sq mi)
  - Change (10 years): ▲ +15.4%
- Demonym(s): Narvikværing; Narviking

Official language
  - Norwegian form: Neutral
- Time zone: UTC+01:00 (CET)
  - Summer (DST): UTC+02:00 (CEST)
- ISO 3166 code: NO-1806
- Website: Official website

Narvik (Northern Sami: Áhkanjárga) is the third-largest municipality in Nordland county, Norway, by population. The administrative centre of the municipality is the town of Narvik. Some of the notable villages in the municipality include Ankenesstrand, Ballangen, Beisfjord, Bjerkvik, Bjørnfjell, Elvegården, Kjøpsvik, Skjomen, Håkvik, Hergot, Straumsnes, and Vidrek. The Elvegårdsmoen army camp is located near Bjerkvik.

Narvik is located on the shores of the Ofotfjorden. The municipality is part of the traditional district of Ofoten of Northern Norway, inside the Arctic Circle. Narvik Municipality borders Hamarøy Municipality to the southwest; Evenes Municipality to the northwest; Bardu Municipality, Gratangen Municipality, Lavangen Municipality, and Tjeldsund Municipality (in Troms county) to the north; and Norrbotten County (Lapland) in Sweden to the south and east.

The 3,432-square-kilometre (1,325 sq mi) municipality is the 10th largest by area out of the 357 municipalities in Norway. Narvik Municipality is the 61st most populous municipality in Norway with a population of 21,580. The municipality's population density is 6.3 inhabitants per square kilometre (16/sq mi) and its population has increased by 15.4% over the previous 10-year period.

== General information ==
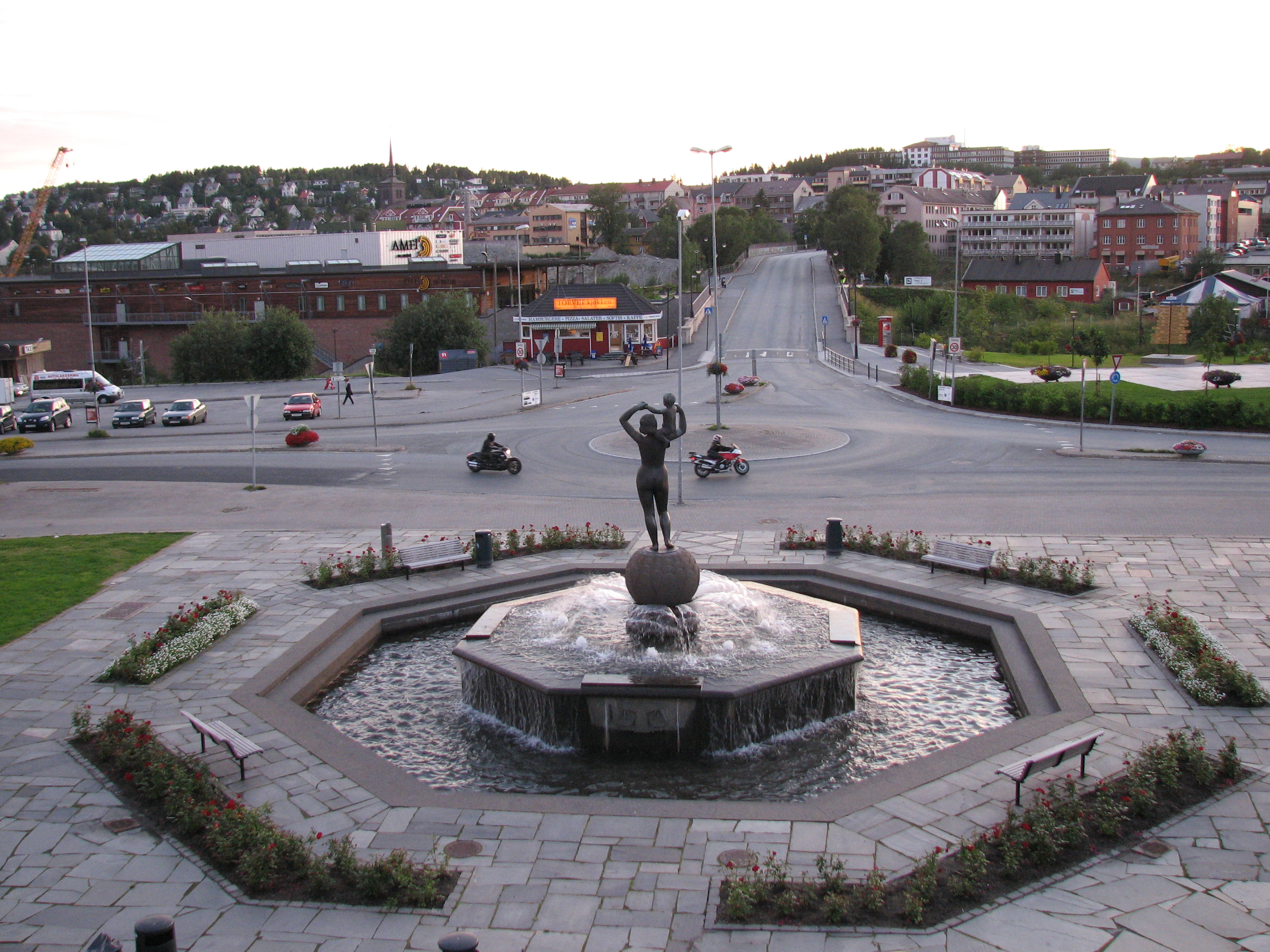
Central Narvik with a view on the freedom monument 'Liv opp av kaos' ('Life out of chaos', 1956) by Narvik's sculptor Gunnar Olaf Finn Eriksen.

The municipality of Narvik was established on 1 January 1902 when the village of Narvik received status as a proper town (kjøpstad) and was separated from the large Ankenes Municipality. Initially, the town-municipality of Narvik had 3,705 residents.

On 1 January 1974, Ankenes Municipality was merged with the town-municipality of Narvik, forming a new, larger Narvik Municipality. After the merger, the new Narvik Municipality had 19,780 residents. On 1 January 1999, a small area of Narvik Municipality (population: 9) was transferred to the neighboring Evenes Municipality.

On 1 January 2020, Narvik Municipality was merged with the neighboring Ballangen Municipality and the eastern half of Tysfjord Municipality to form a new, larger Narvik Municipality. This occurred because in 2017 the municipal government agreed to merge after the Parliament of Norway required Tysfjord Municipality to be split up.

=== Coat of arms ===
The coat of arms was adopted on 20 June 2019 for use starting on 1 January 2020 after a municipal merger. The blazon is "Azure, a mountain peak argent". This means the arms have a blue field (background) and the charge is a mountain peak. The mountain peak has a tincture of argent which means it is commonly colored white, but if it is made out of metal, then silver is used. The arms were designed to look like the local mountain Stetind. The arms were designed by Eirik Djupvik.

The coat of arms was granted on 1 June 1951 and they were in use until 1 January 2020 when there was a municipal merger. The official blazon is "Gules, an anchor Or" (Norwegian: På rød bunn et opprett gull anker). This means the arms have a red field (background) and the charge is an anchor. The anchor has a tincture of Or which means it is commonly colored yellow, but if it is made out of metal, then gold is used. The anchor symbolises Narvik's status as an important port (the largest harbour in North Norway). The arms were designed by Hallvard Trætteberg.

Current arms since 2020

Arms (1951-2019)

=== Name ===
The municipality (originally the town of Narvik) is named after the old Narvik farm (Old Norse: Knarravík or Njarðarvík) since the town was built there. The two possible Old Norse roots have differing meanings. If it comes from Knarravík, then the meaning of the first element is the genitive plural form of knǫrr or knarr which means "merchant ship". The other option is that the name is derived from Njarðarvík. In that case, the first element comes from the old pagan god name Njǫrðr. Both options share the same last element, vík, which means "inlet". Historically, the name was spelled Narduigh or Narvigen.

The harbour in the town of Narvik was once called Victoriahavn after Queen Victoria of the United Kingdom, however Sweden's Crown Princess Victoria was also honoured.

== History ==
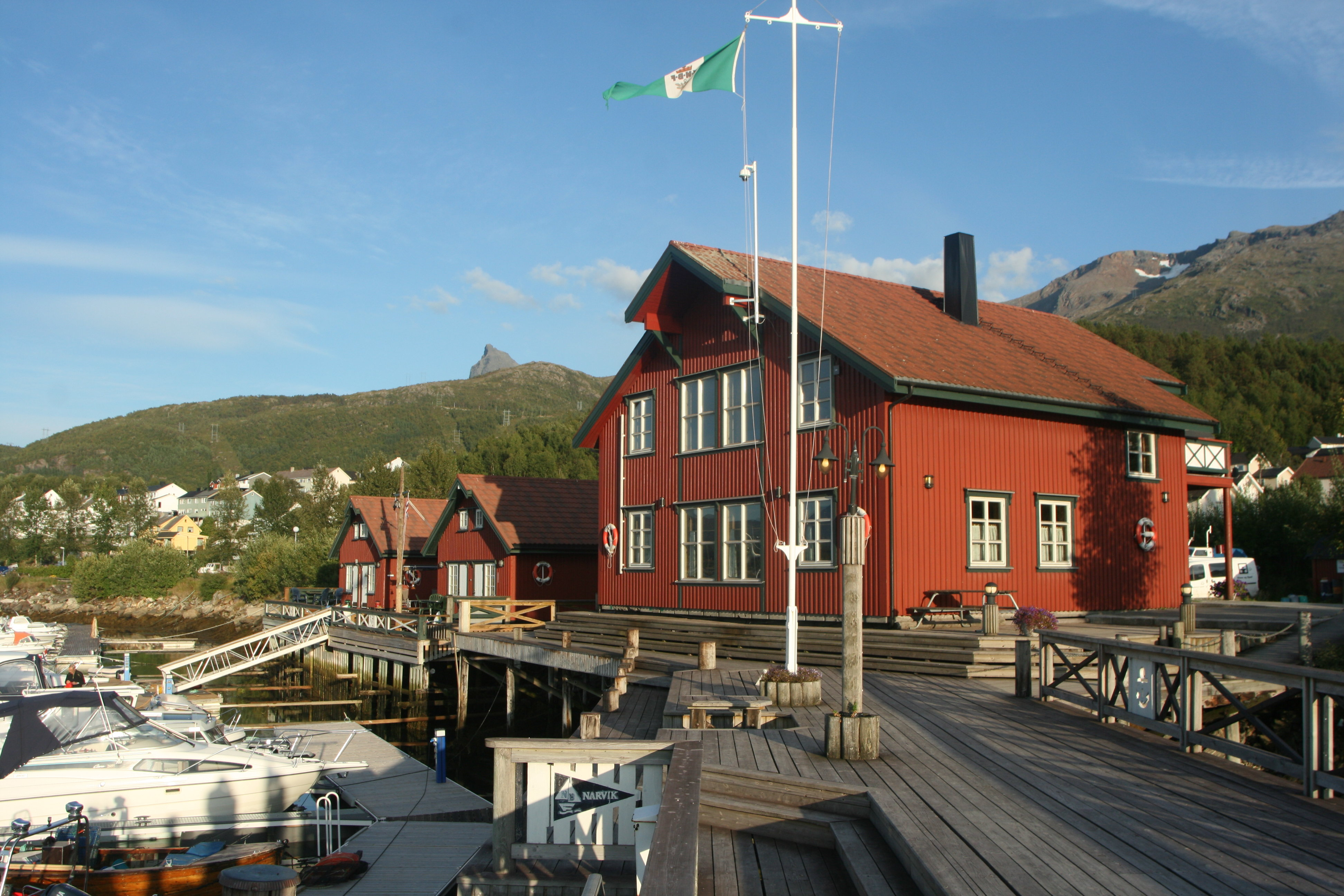
View of Narvik at night from the highest point accessible to cars

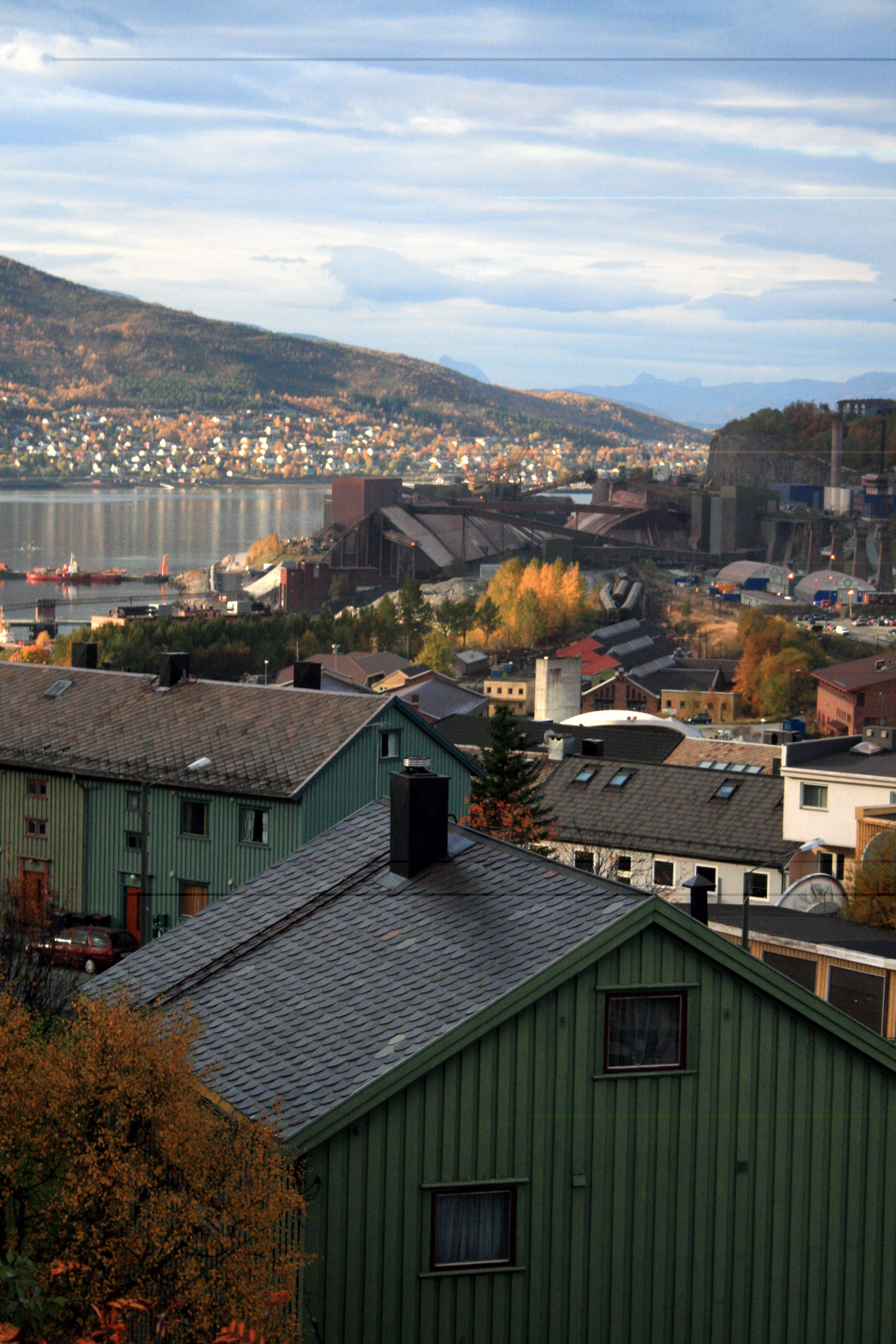
Near Narvik city centre; Ankenesstrand is seen across the bay

The Narvik area was settled in the Bronze Age. Not very much is known about these people, but the Vikings lived in this area.

The town of Narvik was developed as an all-year ice free port for the Swedish iron mines in Kiruna and Gällivare . The history of modern Narvik begins in the 1870s, when the Swedish government began to understand the potential of the iron ore mines in Kiruna, Sweden. Obtaining iron ore from Kiruna had one significant problem in that there was no suitable Swedish port. The nearest Swedish port, Luleå, had limitations. It was covered with ice all winter, it is far from Kiruna, and it allows only medium-sized bulk freight vessels. Narvik offered a port which is ice-free thanks to the warm Gulf Stream, and is naturally large, allowing boats of virtually any size to anchor, up to 208 metres (682 ft) long and 27 metres (89 ft) deep. The Swedish company (Gällivarre Aktiebolag) built the Iron Ore Line (Malmbanan) to Riksgränsen on the Norway–Sweden border. The Norwegian Ofotbanen railway line connects Narvik to the Swedish border.

Swedish mining corporation LKAB still ships the majority of its ore from Narvik (a total 25 million tons a year). It is an important employer and landowner in Narvik, although its influence is not as prominent as in the past.

=== World War II ===
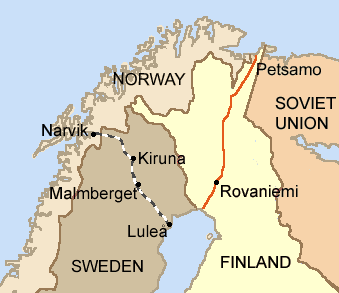
Iron ore is extracted in Kiruna and Malmberget, and brought by rail to the harbours of Luleå and Narvik. (Borders as of 1920–1940.)

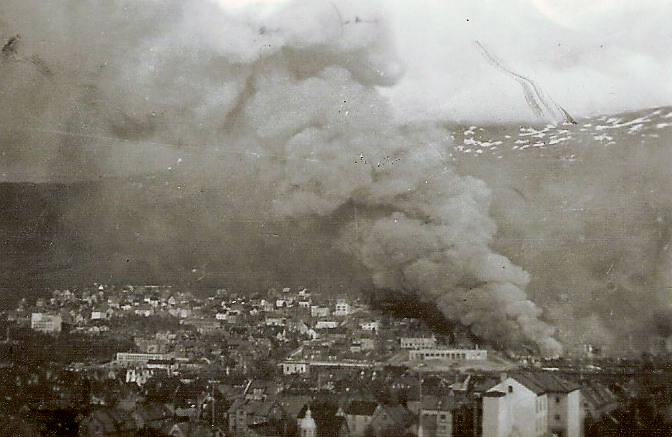
Narvik burning after German bombing, 2. June 1940

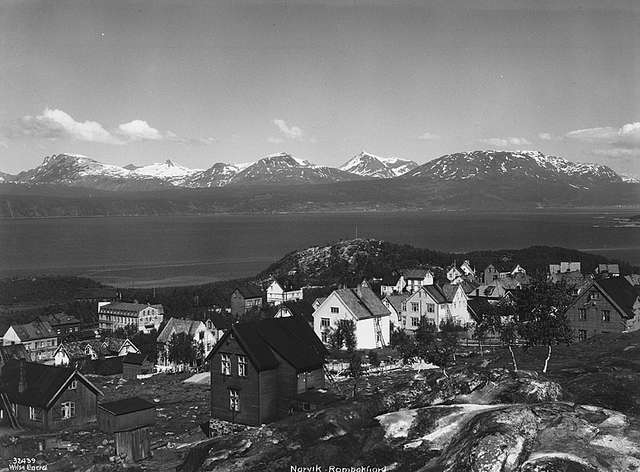
Narvik 1928 with the fjord Rombaken as backdrop

The port of Narvik proved to be strategically valuable in the early years of World War II and the town became a focal point of the Norwegian campaign. In 1939, Germany's war industry depended upon iron ore mined in Kiruna and Malmberget in Sweden. During the summer season, this ore could be sent by cargo ship to Germany through the Baltic Sea via the Swedish port of Luleå on the Gulf of Bothnia. However, when the Gulf of Bothnia froze during the winter, more shipments of the ore needed to be transported through Narvik and, from there, down the west coast of Norway to Germany. The town of Narvik is linked by rail to Sweden, but not to any other towns in Norway. As a result, Narvik serves as a gateway to the ore fields of Sweden that cannot be easily reached from southern Norway via land. Winston Churchill realized that the control of Narvik meant stopping most German imports of iron ore during the winter of 1940. This would be advantageous to the Allies, and it might help shorten the war. Equally as important, later in the war, German submarines and warships based there threatened the allied supply line to the Soviet Union.

Churchill proposed laying a naval minefield in Norwegian territorial waters around Narvik (referred to as "the Leads"), or else occupying the town with Allied troops. The Allies hoped that they might be able to use an occupied Narvik as a base from which to secure the Swedish ore fields and/or to send supplies and reinforcements to Finland, then fighting the Finnish Winter War with the Soviet Union. Plans to lay a minefield around Narvik or to seize the town met with debate within the British government – since both plans would mean a violation of Norway's neutrality and sovereignty.

Finally, on 8 April 1940, the British Admiralty launched Operation Wilfred, an attempt to lay anti-shipping minefields around Narvik in Norwegian territorial waters. Coincidentally, Germany launched its invasion of Norway (Operation Weserübung) on the next day. During this invasion, ten German destroyers, each carrying 200 mountain infantry soldiers, were sent to Narvik. The outdated Norwegian coastal defence ships HNoMS Eidsvold and HNoMS Norge attempted to resist the invasion, but both Norwegian warships were sunk after a short and uneven battle. The Royal Navy quickly dispatched several ships to Narvik, including the battleship HMS Warspite, and during the Battles of Narvik, the British took control of the coast, destroying the German destroyers that had brought the invasion force to Narvik, as well as other German ships in the area.

On 12 April 1940, the first convoys of Allied soldiers were sent under Major-General Pierse Joseph Mackesy to Narvik. The Admiralty urged Mackesy to conduct an assault on Narvik from the sea as soon as possible. However, Mackesy believed that the German harbour defences were too strong for such an invasion to take place. The Admiralty argued that a naval bombardment of Norway would enable the troops to land safely, but General Mackesy refused to subject Norwegian citizens to such a bombardment, and instead he chose to land his troops near Narvik and wait until the snow melted to take over the town.

Coordinated by the Norwegian General Carl Gustav Fleischer, Norwegian, French, Polish, and British forces recaptured Narvik on 28 May 1940. This is also considered the first Allied infantry victory in World War II. However, by that time, the Allies were losing the Battle of France and the evacuation from Dunkirk was underway. Since the Nazi German invasion of France had made Scandinavia largely irrelevant, and since the valuable troops assigned to Narvik were badly needed elsewhere, the Allies withdrew from Narvik on 8 June 1940 in Operation Alphabet. The same day, while operating in the Narvik area, the German battleships Scharnhorst and Gneisenau sank the British aircraft carrier HMS Glorious during the withdrawal from this battle. Without support from the Allied naval task force, the Norwegians were outnumbered, and they had to lay down their arms in Norway on 10 June 1940. This was not a complete capitulation, since the Norwegians kept on fighting guerrilla operations inland.

Possession of the Ofotfjord was also important to the German Kriegsmarine (navy) since it provided a refuge for warships like the "pocket battleship" Lützow and the battleship Tirpitz outside the range (at the time) of air attacks from Scotland. Also, possibly U-boats could be based at Narvik.

== Government ==
Narvik Municipality is responsible for primary education (through 10th grade), outpatient health services, senior citizen services, welfare and other social services, zoning, economic development, and municipal roads and utilities. The municipality is governed by a municipal council of directly elected representatives. The mayor is indirectly elected by a vote of the municipal council. The municipality is under the jurisdiction of the Midtre Hålogaland District Court and the Hålogaland Court of Appeal.

=== Municipal council ===
The municipal council (Kommunestyre) of Narvik Municipality is made up of 31 representatives that are elected to four year terms. The tables below show the current and historical composition of the council by political party.

Narvik kommunestyre 2023–2027
Party name (in Norwegian)	Number of representatives
Labour Party (Arbeiderpartiet)	8
Progress Party (Fremskrittspartiet)	4
Conservative Party (Høyre)	7
Industry and Business Party (Industri‑ og Næringspartiet)	4
Christian Democratic Party (Kristelig Folkeparti)	1
Red Party (Rødt)	1
Centre Party (Senterpartiet)	3
Socialist Left Party (Sosialistisk Venstreparti)	3
Total number of members:	31

Narvik kommunestyre 2019–2023
Party name (in Norwegian)	Number of representatives
Labour Party (Arbeiderpartiet)	15
Progress Party (Fremskrittspartiet)	4
Green Party (Miljøpartiet De Grønne)	2
Conservative Party (Høyre)	5
Christian Democratic Party (Kristelig Folkeparti)	1
Red Party (Rødt)	1
Centre Party (Senterpartiet)	9
Socialist Left Party (Sosialistisk Venstreparti)	4
Total number of members:	41
Note: On 1 January 2020, Ballangen Municipality and part of Tysfjord Municipality became part of Narvik Municipality.

Narvik kommunestyre 2015–2019
Party name (in Norwegian)	Number of representatives
Labour Party (Arbeiderpartiet)	13
Progress Party (Fremskrittspartiet)	4
Green Party (Miljøpartiet De Grønne)	2
Conservative Party (Høyre)	12
Christian Democratic Party (Kristelig Folkeparti)	1
Red Party (Rødt)	2
Socialist Left Party (Sosialistisk Venstreparti)	6
Liberal Party (Venstre)	1
Total number of members:	41

Narvik kommunestyre 2011–2015
Party name (in Norwegian)	Number of representatives
Labour Party (Arbeiderpartiet)	15
Progress Party (Fremskrittspartiet)	9
Conservative Party (Høyre)	10
Christian Democratic Party (Kristelig Folkeparti)	1
Red Party (Rødt)	2
Socialist Left Party (Sosialistisk Venstreparti)	2
Liberal Party (Venstre)	2
Total number of members:	41

Narvik kommunestyre 2007–2011
Party name (in Norwegian)	Number of representatives
Labour Party (Arbeiderpartiet)	14
Progress Party (Fremskrittspartiet)	13
Conservative Party (Høyre)	5
Christian Democratic Party (Kristelig Folkeparti)	2
Centre Party (Senterpartiet)	1
Socialist Left Party (Sosialistisk Venstreparti)	5
Liberal Party (Venstre)	1
Total number of members:	41

Narvik kommunestyre 2003–2007
Party name (in Norwegian)	Number of representatives
Labour Party (Arbeiderpartiet)	14
Progress Party (Fremskrittspartiet)	9
Conservative Party (Høyre)	6
Christian Democratic Party (Kristelig Folkeparti)	2
Centre Party (Senterpartiet)	1
Socialist Left Party (Sosialistisk Venstreparti)	8
Liberal Party (Venstre)	1
Total number of members:	41

Narvik kommunestyre 1999–2003
Party name (in Norwegian)	Number of representatives
Labour Party (Arbeiderpartiet)	16
Progress Party (Fremskrittspartiet)	5
Conservative Party (Høyre)	9
Christian Democratic Party (Kristelig Folkeparti)	3
Centre Party (Senterpartiet)	2
Socialist Left Party (Sosialistisk Venstreparti)	5
Liberal Party (Venstre)	1
Total number of members:	41

Narvik kommunestyre 1995–1999
Party name (in Norwegian)	Number of representatives
Labour Party (Arbeiderpartiet)	23
Progress Party (Fremskrittspartiet)	5
Conservative Party (Høyre)	9
Christian Democratic Party (Kristelig Folkeparti)	3
Centre Party (Senterpartiet)	5
Socialist Left Party (Sosialistisk Venstreparti)	5
Liberal Party (Venstre)	1
Joint list of the Left/Socialists Electoral Union and Communist Party (Venstresosialistenes Valgforbund og Kommunistiske Parti)	2
Total number of members:	53

Narvik kommunestyre 1991–1995
Party name (in Norwegian)	Number of representatives
Labour Party (Arbeiderpartiet)	25
Progress Party (Fremskrittspartiet)	2
Conservative Party (Høyre)	9
Christian Democratic Party (Kristelig Folkeparti)	2
Centre Party (Senterpartiet)	4
Socialist Left Party (Sosialistisk Venstreparti)	9
Liberal Party (Venstre)	1
Left/Socialists Electoral Union (Venstresosialistenes Valgforbun)	1
Total number of members:	53

Narvik kommunestyre 1987–1991
Party name (in Norwegian)	Number of representatives
Labour Party (Arbeiderpartiet)	26
Conservative Party (Høyre)	14
Christian Democratic Party (Kristelig Folkeparti)	2
Centre Party (Senterpartiet)	2
Socialist Left Party (Sosialistisk Venstreparti)	6
Liberal Party (Venstre)	2
Joint list of the Left/Socialists Electoral Union and Communist Party (Venstresosialistenes Valgforbund og Kommunistiske Parti)	1
Total number of members:	53

Narvik kommunestyre 1983–1987
Party name (in Norwegian)	Number of representatives
Labour Party (Arbeiderpartiet)	31
Conservative Party (Høyre)	17
Christian Democratic Party (Kristelig Folkeparti)	2
Centre Party (Senterpartiet)	3
Socialist Left Party (Sosialistisk Venstreparti)	5
Liberal Party (Venstre)	2
Joint list of the Left/Socialists Electoral Union and Communist Party (Venstresosialistenes Valgforbund og Kommunistiske Parti)	1
Total number of members:	61

Narvik kommunestyre 1979–1983
Party name (in Norwegian)	Number of representatives
Labour Party (Arbeiderpartiet)	28
Conservative Party (Høyre)	19
Christian Democratic Party (Kristelig Folkeparti)	3
Centre Party (Senterpartiet)	3
Socialist Left Party (Sosialistisk Venstreparti)	3
Liberal Party (Venstre)	4
Joint list of Independent socialists and Communist Party (Uavhengige sosialister og Norges Kommunistiske Part)	1
Total number of members:	61

Narvik kommunestyre 1975–1979
Party name (in Norwegian)	Number of representatives
Labour Party (Arbeiderpartiet)	31
Conservative Party (Høyre)	12
Christian Democratic Party (Kristelig Folkeparti)	4
New People's Party (Nye Folkepartiet)	2
Centre Party (Senterpartiet)	4
Socialist Left Party (Sosialistisk Venstreparti)	6
Liberal Party (Venstre)	2
Total number of members:	61

Narvik bystyre 1971–1975
Party name (in Norwegian)	Number of representatives
Labour Party (Arbeiderpartiet)	29
Conservative Party (Høyre)	10
Christian Democratic Party (Kristelig Folkeparti)	2
Centre Party (Senterpartiet)	2
Socialist People's Party (Sosialistisk Folkeparti)	3
Liberal Party (Venstre)	3
Socialist common list (Venstresosialistiske felleslister)	4
Total number of members:	53
Note: On 1 January 1974, Ankenes Municipality became part of Narvik Municipality.

Narvik bystyre 1967–1971
Party name (in Norwegian)	Number of representatives
Labour Party (Arbeiderpartiet)	28
Conservative Party (Høyre)	11
Communist Party (Kommunistiske Parti)	2
Christian Democratic Party (Kristelig Folkeparti)	1
Socialist People's Party (Sosialistisk Folkeparti)	5
Liberal Party (Venstre)	6
Total number of members:	53

Narvik bystyre 1963–1967
Party name (in Norwegian)	Number of representatives
Labour Party (Arbeiderpartiet)	28
Conservative Party (Høyre)	12
Communist Party (Kommunistiske Parti)	2
Christian Democratic Party (Kristelig Folkeparti)	1
Socialist People's Party (Sosialistisk Folkeparti)	5
Liberal Party (Venstre)	5
Total number of members:	53

Narvik bystyre 1959–1963
Party name (in Norwegian)	Number of representatives
Labour Party (Arbeiderpartiet)	28
Conservative Party (Høyre)	12
Communist Party (Kommunistiske Parti)	4
Christian Democratic Party (Kristelig Folkeparti)	4
Liberal Party (Venstre)	5
Total number of members:	53

Narvik bystyre 1955–1959
Party name (in Norwegian)	Number of representatives
Labour Party (Arbeiderpartiet)	30
Conservative Party (Høyre)	9
Communist Party (Kommunistiske Parti)	6
Christian Democratic Party (Kristelig Folkeparti)	4
Liberal Party (Venstre)	4
Total number of members:	53

Narvik bystyre 1951–1955
Party name (in Norwegian)	Number of representatives
Labour Party (Arbeiderpartiet)	26
Conservative Party (Høyre)	11
Communist Party (Kommunistiske Parti)	8
Christian Democratic Party (Kristelig Folkeparti)	3
Liberal Party (Venstre)	4
Total number of members:	52

Narvik bystyre 1947–1951
Party name (in Norwegian)	Number of representatives
Labour Party (Arbeiderpartiet)	19
Conservative Party (Høyre)	10
Communist Party (Kommunistiske Parti)	10
Liberal Party (Venstre)	5
Total number of members:	44

Narvik bystyre 1945–1947
Party name (in Norwegian)	Number of representatives
Labour Party (Arbeiderpartiet)	17
Conservative Party (Høyre)	9
Communist Party (Kommunistiske Parti)	13
Liberal Party (Venstre)	5
Total number of members:	44

Narvik bystyre 1937–1941*
Party name (in Norwegian)	Number of representatives
Labour Party (Arbeiderpartiet)	23
Conservative Party (Høyre)	11
Liberal Party (Venstre)	3
List of workers, fishermen, and small farmholders (Arbeidere, fiskere, småbrukere liste)	6
Local List(s) (Lokale lister)	1
Total number of members:	44
Note: Due to the German occupation of Norway during World War II, no elections were held for new municipal councils until after the war ended in 1945.

=== Mayors ===
The mayor (Norwegian: ordfører) of Narvik Municipality is the political leader of the municipality and the chairperson of the municipal council. Here is a list of people who have held this position:

- 1902–1902: Ole Martinussen
- 1903–1903: Nils Astrup
- 1904–1904: Statius Mosling
- 1905–1905: Ole Martinussen
- 1906–1907: Statius Mosling
- 1908–1908: Edvard Kristiansen
- 1909–1910: Karl Kristian Høiem
- 1911–1911: Rolf Jacobsen (V)
- 1912–1913: Albert Zintzen
- 1914–1921: Julius Bastian Olsen (Ap)
- 1922–1922: Einar Wexelsen (V)
- 1923–1927: Julius Bastian Olsen (Ap)
- 1929–1930: Hans Kisen (Ap)
- 1934–1940: Theodor Broch (Ap)
- 1940–1945: Occupation of Norway by Nazi Germany
- 1945–1945: Theodor Broch (Ap)
- 1945–1949: Alfred Nilsen (Ap)
- 1949–1953: Odd Finseth (Ap)
- 1953–1967: Sverre Øvergård (Ap)
- 1968–1973: Arne Kristian Meedby (Ap)
- 1974–1979: Edgar Sneve (Ap)
- 1980–1987: Roald Sandvoll (Ap)
- 1988–1999: Odd G. Andreassen (Ap)
- 2000–2007: Olav Sigurd Alstad (Ap)
- 2007–2011: Karen Margrethe Kuvaas (Ap)
- 2011–2015: Tore Nysæter (H)
- 2015–present: Rune Edvardsen (Ap)

== Geography ==
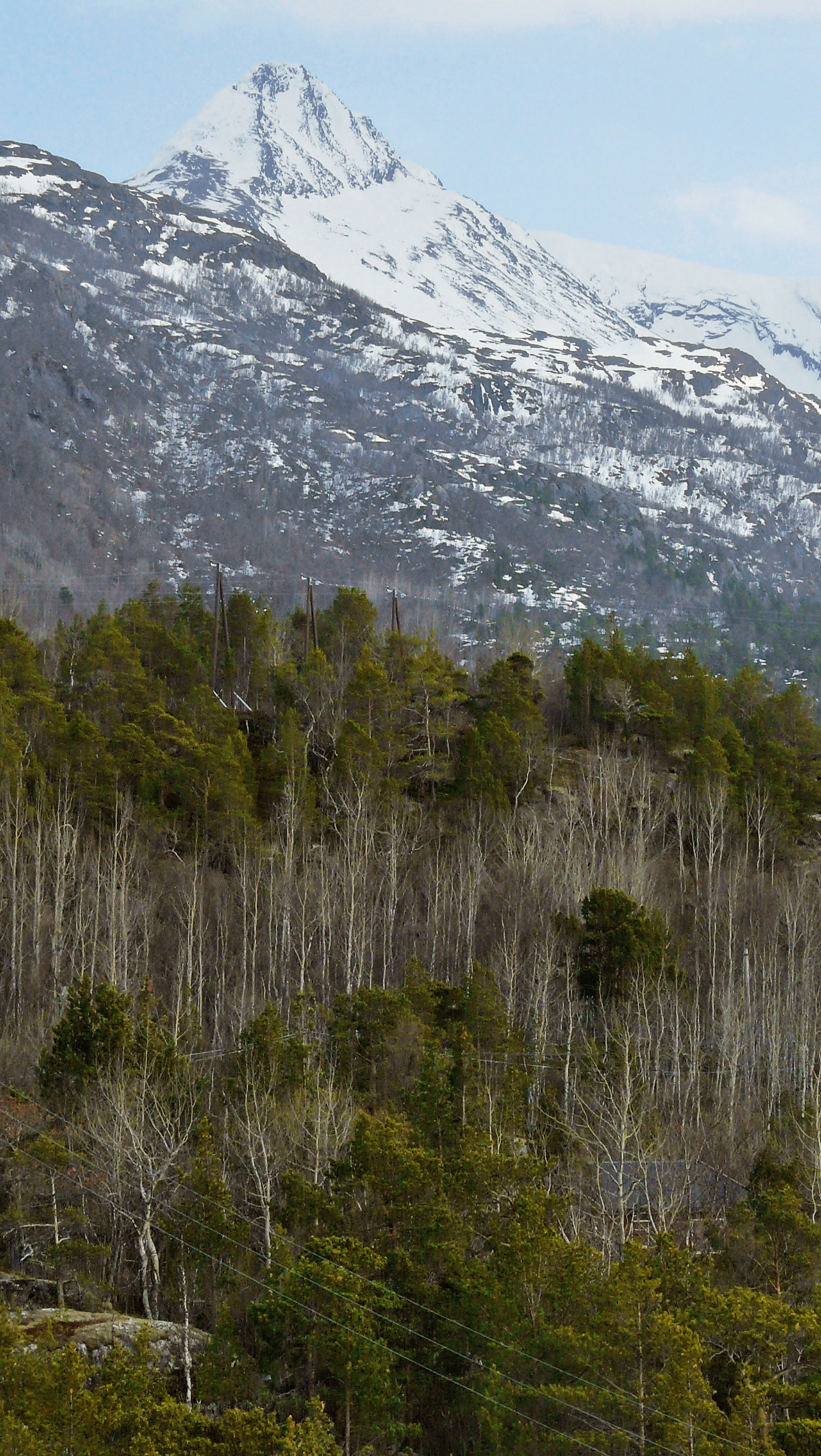
Skjomtinden (1,575 m), May 2009

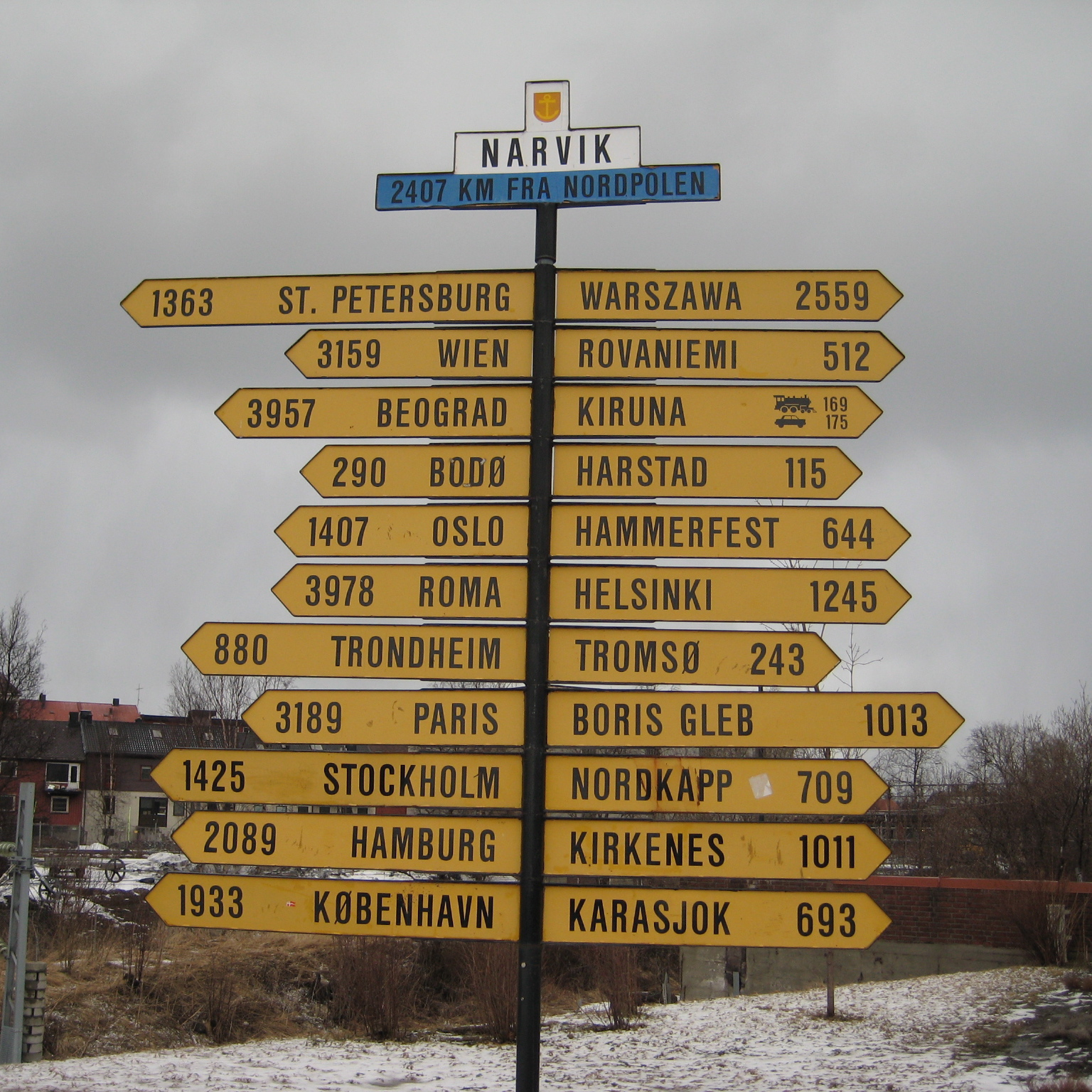
Narvik – 2,407 km (1,496 mi) from North Pole

Narvik Municipality is the 10th largest municipality in Norway and it covers large areas of rural land outside the town itself. Some of the other settlements in the municipality are Bjerkvik (located at the head of the Herjangsfjord), Håkvik, Beisfjord (along the Beisfjorden) and Skjomen. The eastern part, towards the border with Sweden, is dominated by mountains, including the 1,893.7-metre (6,213 ft) tall Storsteinfjellet which is the highest point in the municipality. The mountain Stetinden is also a notable mountain for the region.

There are also valleys such as the Vassdalen and many, many lakes, including the lakes Baugevatnet, Båvrojávrre, Børsvatnet, Gautelisvatnet, Geitvatnet, Hartvikvatnet, Hjertvatnet, Indre Sildvikvatnet, Iptojávri, Kjelvatnet, Langvatnet, Lossivatnet, Melkevatnet, Rødvatnet, Sealggajávri, Siiddašjávri, Søndre Bukkevatnet, Storvatnet, Tjårdavatnet, and Unna Guovdelisjávri.

The town itself is situated near the innermost part of the deep Ofotfjorden, but even here the mountains, going almost straight up from the blue fjord, reach as high as 1,700 metres (5,600 ft) in Skjomen, where the glacier Frostisen can be seen. Other fjords in Narvik include Skjomen, Beisfjorden, Herjangsfjorden, Efjorden, Tysfjorden, Vestfjorden, and Rombaken. The island Barøya lies just off shore at the mouth of the Ofotfjorden. The Gihtsejiegŋa glacier is also located in Narvik.

Forests cover the lower parts of the mountains (below 500 metres), but near the summits, the snow can stay most of the summer. Narvik has well prepared slopes for alpine skiing, some of which end almost in the town centre.

=== Climate ===
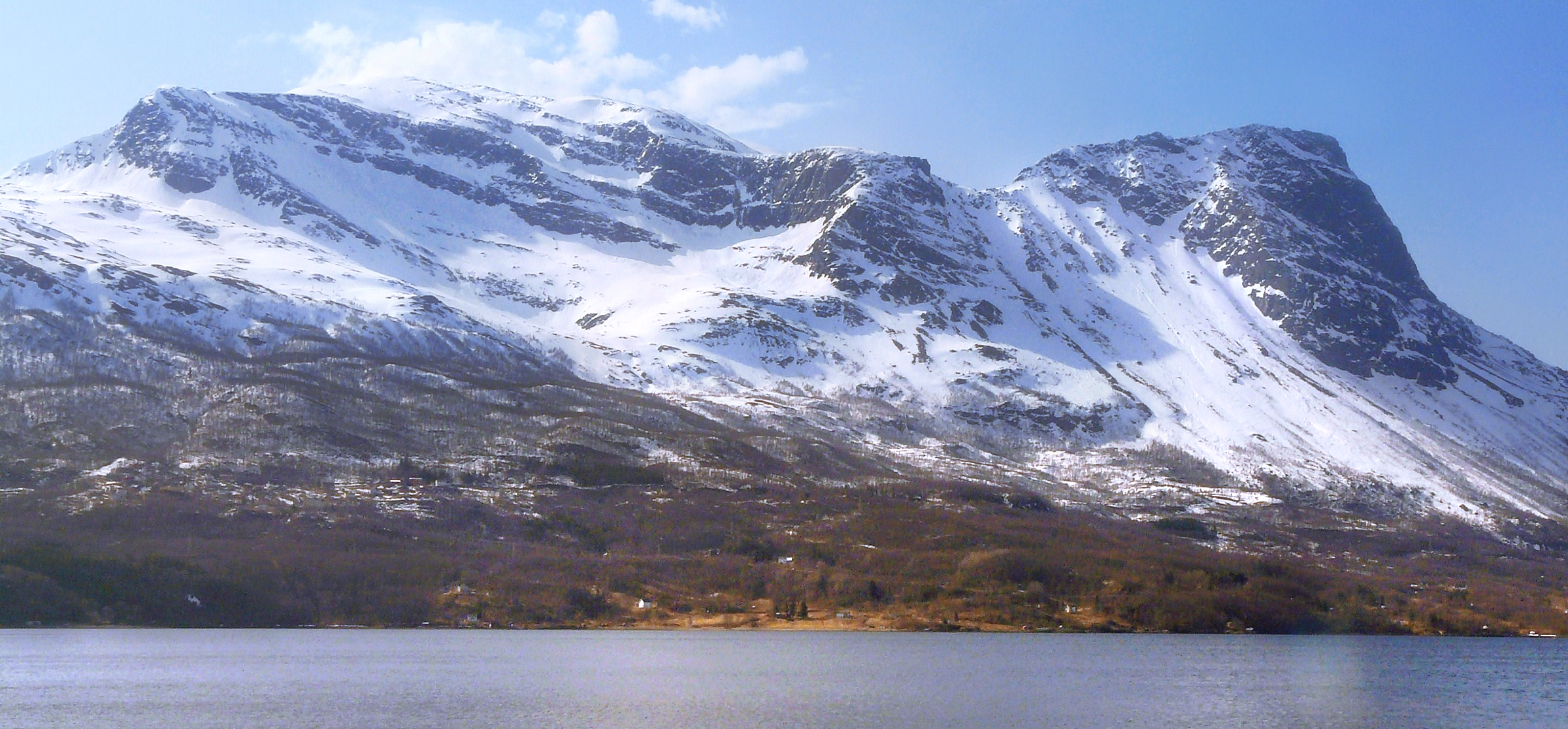
In early May, there is still a large amount of snow in the mountains, as seen here in Rombaken.

Narvik features a boreal climate (Köppen climate classification: Dfc) with fairly cold winters and cool to mild summers. It is close to a humid continental climate due to a mild September. As Narvik is 220 kilometres (140 mi) inside the Arctic Circle, the climate is very mild for the latitude. The mountains surrounding the town give shelter from some of the strong winds typical for coastal areas, but the easterlies can be strong with especially strong wind gusts. The all-time high 32.5 °C (90.5 °F) was set 9 July 2014. July 2014 is warmest month on record with mean 18.7 °C (65.7 °F) and average daily high 24.7 °C (76.5 °F). The all-time low −22.3 °C (−8.1 °F) was recorded on 1 February 1980. Coldest month on record is February 1966 with mean −10.7 °C (12.7 °F) and average daily low −13.2 °C (8.2 °F). The average date for the first overnight freeze in autumn when the low goes below −0 °C (32 °F) is October 13 (1981-2010).

The light varies considerably in Narvik since the sun is below the horizon from late November until mid-January; when there is only a bluish light for a few hours around noon. The mountains surrounding the town in reality extend this period from early November until the end of January. The light is often intense in March and April, with long daylight hours and snow cover since the snow melts in lowland areas in April, but stays in the mountains for several months. The "midnight sun" is above the horizon from 25 May to 20 July (57 days), and the period with continuous daylight lasts a bit longer, from approximately 10 May to the end of July, polar night from 5 December to 6 January (33 days). There is also a transitional period with twilight in the night, so it is not possible to see any stars at night from the last days of April until early August.

Climate data for Narvik Airport, Framnes 1991–2020 (31 m, avg high/low 2003-2016, avg high/low 2019-2025 from Narvik Sentrum, precipitation Narvik III, extremes 1954-2020 includes earlier stations)
Month	Jan	Feb	Mar	Apr	May	Jun	Jul	Aug	Sep	Oct	Nov	Dec	Year
Record high °C (°F)	11.5 (52.7)	9 (48)	12.5 (54.5)	20.4 (68.7)	29.9 (85.8)	30 (86)	32.5 (90.5)	28.6 (83.5)	27.2 (81.0)	19.6 (67.3)	15.8 (60.4)	11.4 (52.5)	32.5 (90.5)
Mean daily maximum °C (°F)	−0.8 (30.6)	0.1 (32.2)	2.2 (36.0)	6.2 (43.2)	11.4 (52.5)	15.5 (59.9)	19.1 (66.4)	17.7 (63.9)	12.9 (55.2)	7.1 (44.8)	3.2 (37.8)	1.2 (34.2)	8.0 (46.4)
Daily mean °C (°F)	−2.3 (27.9)	−2.7 (27.1)	−0.8 (30.6)	2.9 (37.2)	7.4 (45.3)	11.4 (52.5)	14.5 (58.1)	13.5 (56.3)	9.4 (48.9)	4.5 (40.1)	1.2 (34.2)	−0.8 (30.6)	4.9 (40.7)
Mean daily minimum °C (°F)	−5.6 (21.9)	−4.9 (23.2)	−3.4 (25.9)	−0.1 (31.8)	4.1 (39.4)	8.2 (46.8)	11.4 (52.5)	10.5 (50.9)	7 (45)	2.4 (36.3)	−1.2 (29.8)	−3.5 (25.7)	2.1 (35.8)
Record low °C (°F)	−20 (−4)	−22.3 (−8.1)	−15.7 (3.7)	−11.8 (10.8)	−5 (23)	−1 (30)	4.5 (40.1)	0.5 (32.9)	−3.5 (25.7)	−11.1 (12.0)	−13.6 (7.5)	−19 (−2)	−22.3 (−8.1)
Average precipitation mm (inches)	108 (4.3)	98 (3.9)	82 (3.2)	44 (1.7)	56 (2.2)	57 (2.2)	88 (3.5)	91 (3.6)	107 (4.2)	107 (4.2)	99 (3.9)	97 (3.8)	1,034 (40.7)
Source 1: Norwegian Meteorological Institute
Source 2: Seklima (avg highs/lows)

Climate data for Narvik (1961–90)
Month	Jan	Feb	Mar	Apr	May	Jun	Jul	Aug	Sep	Oct	Nov	Dec	Year
Mean daily maximum °C (°F)	−2 (28)	−2 (28)	1 (34)	5 (41)	9 (48)	14 (57)	18 (64)	16 (61)	12 (54)	6 (43)	3 (37)	−1 (30)	7 (44)
Daily mean °C (°F)	−4.1 (24.6)	−3.9 (25.0)	−2 (28)	1.8 (35.2)	6.9 (44.4)	10.9 (51.6)	13.4 (56.1)	12.5 (54.5)	8.4 (47.1)	4.2 (39.6)	−0.2 (31.6)	−2.7 (27.1)	3.8 (38.8)
Mean daily minimum °C (°F)	−7 (19)	−7 (19)	−5 (23)	−2 (28)	3 (37)	7 (45)	11 (52)	10 (50)	6 (43)	2 (36)	−2 (28)	−5 (23)	1 (34)
Average precipitation mm (inches)	69 (2.7)	64 (2.5)	49 (1.9)	44 (1.7)	40 (1.6)	53 (2.1)	74 (2.9)	82 (3.2)	92 (3.6)	110 (4.3)	75 (3.0)	78 (3.1)	830 (32.7)
Average precipitation days (≥ 1mm)	10.6	10.2	8.8	9.1	9.2	12.4	14.7	14.0	15.1	14.5	11.1	12.2	141.9
Source: Norwegian Meteorological Institute – eKlima portal

== Economy ==
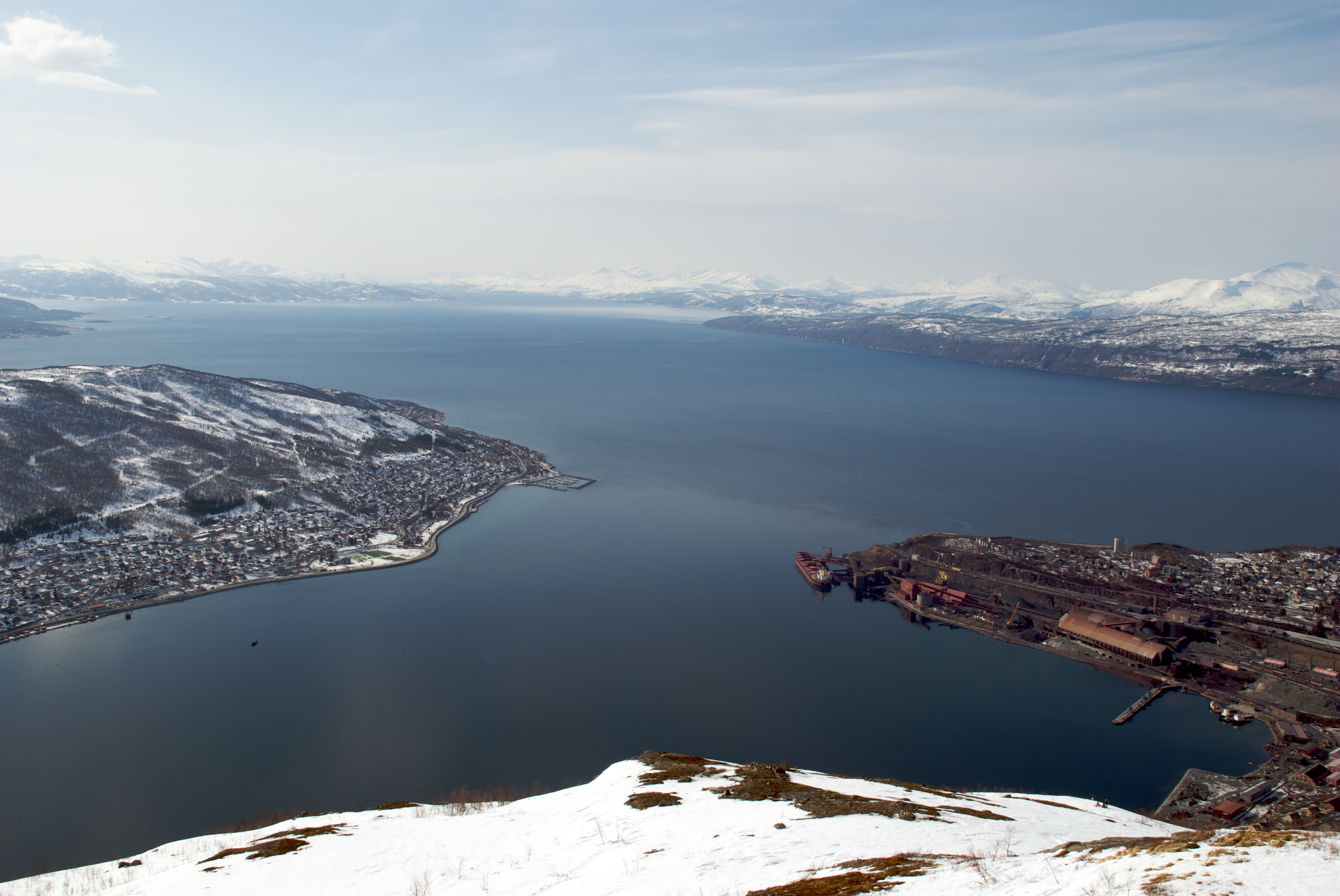
View from Fagernes mountain overlooking Narvik harbour and Ofotfjord, April 2009.

The town of Narvik is a commercial centre for the whole municipality and some of the neighbouring municipalities. Narvik University College has approximately 1,200 students. There are some high-tech businesses in Narvik (among them Natech) and the largest research institute in Northern Norway, Norut Narvik.

A data center is under construction (as of 2026).

Narvik was one of the first areas to be affected by the 2008 financial crisis. It lost the equivalent of US$36 million in August 2007 after it invested in Citigroup securities. As the Norwegian government refused to bail them out, Narvik was forced to implement severe budget cuts.

=== Recreation and tourism ===
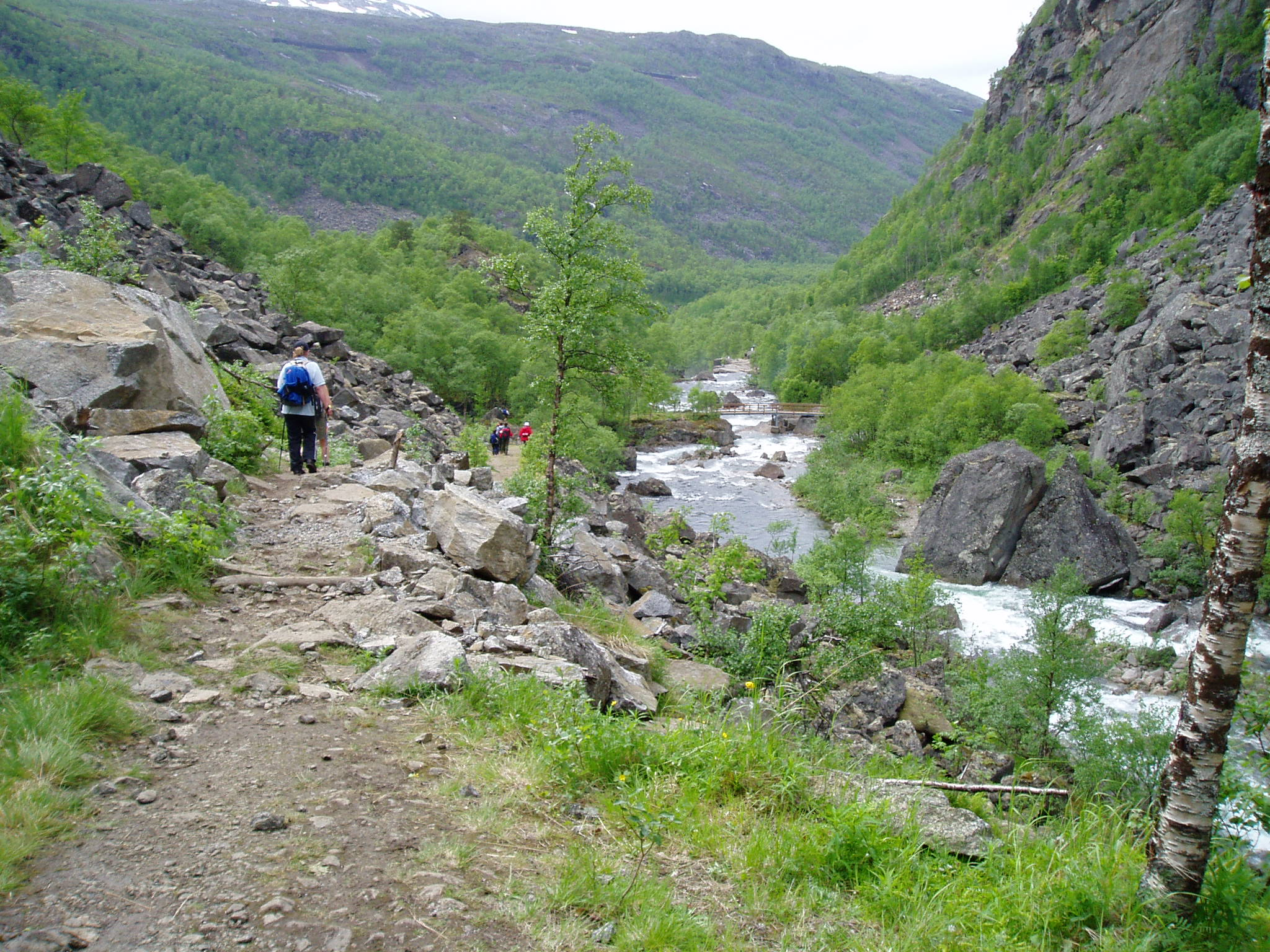
Rallarveien; hiking route near the railway from the mountains down to the Rombaken fjord

Narvik has access to numerous outdoor activities. This is the best known location in northern Norway for alpine skiing.

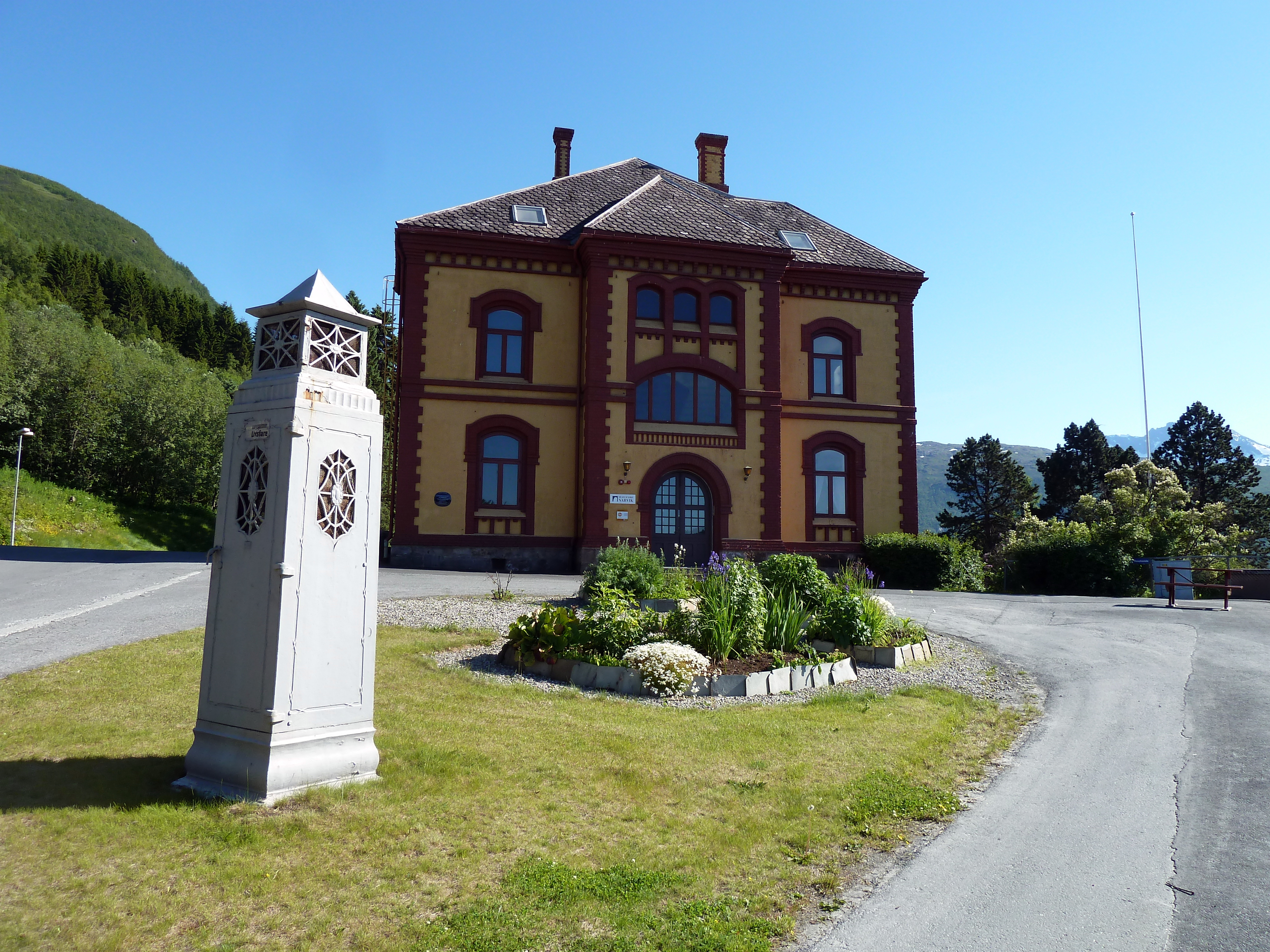
Museum Nord - Narvik

There are lifts, and several of the slopes are floodlit. There is also a cable car to Fagernesfjellet, with a view and the possibility to walk even higher up in the mountains. Narvik Winter Festival (Norwegian: Vinterfestuka) takes place in early March. Mountain hiking is very popular in the area, and the mountain area near the Swedish border has several places of accommodation. A signed mountain bike route is also available.

Wreck diving attracts divers to Narvik, as there are a lot of wrecks in or near the harbour, and more spread out in the fjord. Fishing in the fjord or in lakes and streams is a popular leisure activity. There are salmon rivers in Skjomen, Beisfjord and Bjerkvik.

== Transportation ==
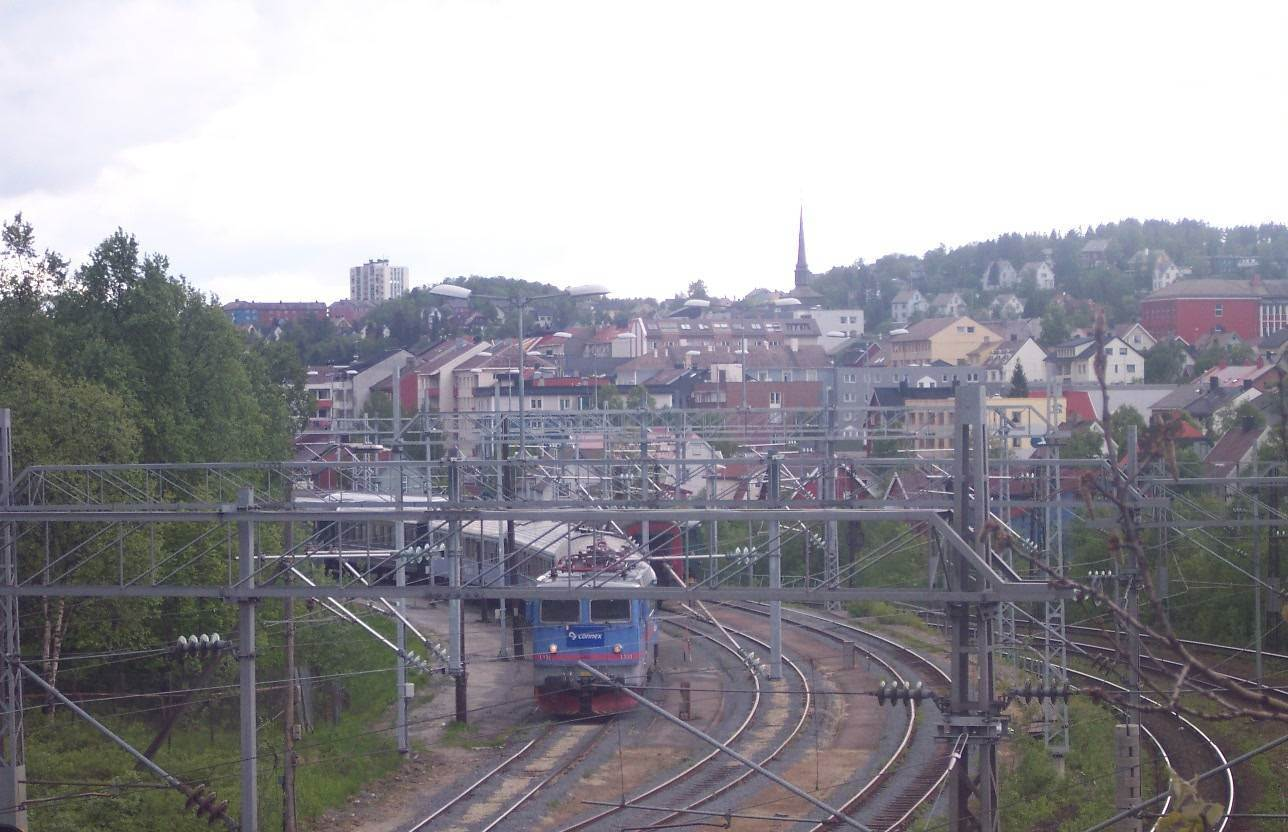
The railway in Narvik

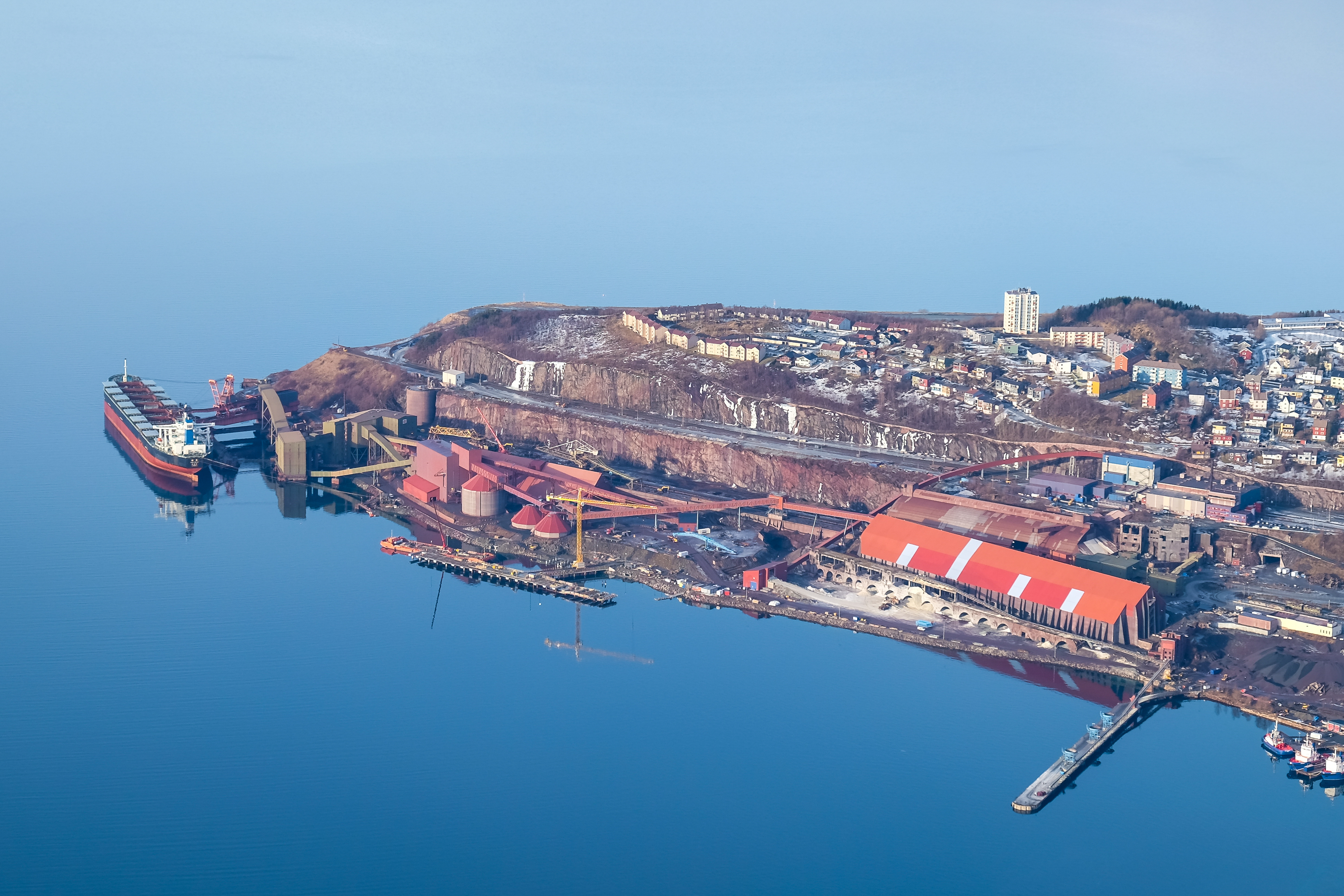
The harbour in Narvik, Norway where a ship is loaded with iron ore.

Narvik municipality is a cross-roads of transportation in Northern Norway since the Ofotfjord cuts into the municipality leaving only a few kilometers of land between the fjord and the national border with Sweden. The one major highway heading north–south at this point runs through Narvik, the European route E6. The Port of Narvik located in the town of Narvik is also a major transportation and freight hub for the region.

=== Rail ===
A present and historical key to land transportation to Narvik is the Ofoten Line railway from northern Sweden across the mountains to this port town, which connect to the Swedish Iron Ore Line southeast towards Luleå and from there on south to the other Swedish railway lines. Goods like iron ore shipped via this railroad make Narvik an important seaport. The railway has stops at Bjørnfjell Station, Katterat Station, Søsterbekk Station, and Narvik Station.

Because of the extreme terrain there, there are no railways northwards from Narvik or south to Bodø, Norway, which is at the northern end of the rest of Norway's rail network. There have been proposals for a Narvik-Bodø rail connection with a Northern Norway Line, but the proposals have failed due to extremely high estimated construction costs. It is possible to get from Narvik to the rest of Norway through lengthy transits on the Swedish railway lines, most commonly passing through Sundsvall Central Station and Luleå Central Station.

The activity related to the railway and large port facilities are still important in Narvik, and goods to and from North Norway, Sweden, and Finland are often distributed via Narvik. In the proposed project called the "Northern East West Freight Corridor" portion of the Eurasian Land Bridge, there are plans for using Narvik as a port for goods from East Asia bound for eastern North America. The reason is that the railway and ocean distances using this route are shorter than through central Europe to Western European ports.

=== Air ===
Narvik is served by Harstad/Narvik Airport, Evenes which is 57 kilometres (35 mi) by road from Narvik and has regular flights to Oslo, Trondheim, Bodø, Tromsø and Andenes.

== Culture ==
The Narvik War Museum (Narvik Krigsmuseum) covers the war years 1940–1945. The museum displays the Victoria Cross awarded posthumously to Captain Bernard Warburton-Lee of the British Royal Navy and a rare German Enigma coding machine.

Museum Nord - Narvik tells of the development of the ice-free harbour of Narvik and the rapid transformation of the town over the past century. The building that houses Museum Nord - Narvik was erected in 1902 as the head office of the Norwegian state railway company, Norges statsbaner and was designed by architect, Paul Due.

=== Sport ===
Narvik's most successful club team in the 21st century has been Narvik IK in men's ice hockey, which have varyingly played in the Tier 1 (EliteHockey Ligaen) and Tier 2 (1. divisjon) Norwegian national leagues, having previously moved to 1. divisjon from the Swedish Tier 5 (Hockeytrean) for the 2012–13 season. As of April 2026, their highest placement in EliteHockey Ligaen was in the 2025–26 season where they placed 5th out of 10 teams.

The Narvikfjellet alpine skiing facility immediately southeast of the main town has been given the hosting rights for the 2029 FIS Alpine World Ski Championships.

In men's association football, the main team has been FK Mjølner. The team last played in the Eliteserien top league in the 1989 season, and is playing on Tier 5 (4. divisjon) as of the 2025 season.

=== Churches ===
The Church of Norway has four parishes (sokn) within Narvik Municipality. It is part of the Ofoten prosti (deanery) in the Diocese of Sør-Hålogaland.

Churches in Narvik Municipality
Parish (sokn)	Church Name	Location of the Church	Year built
Ankenes	Ankenes Church	Ankenesstrand	1867
Ankenes	Håkvik Chapel	Håkvik	1980
Bjerkvik	Bjerkvik Church	Bjerkvik	1955
Bjerkvik	Bjørnfjell Chapel	Bjørnfjell	1952
Narvik	Narvik Church	Narvik	1925
Narvik	Fredskapellet	Narvik	1957
Narvik	Hergot Chapel	Hergot	2005
Skjomen	Skjomen Church	Elvegården	1893

== Notable people ==
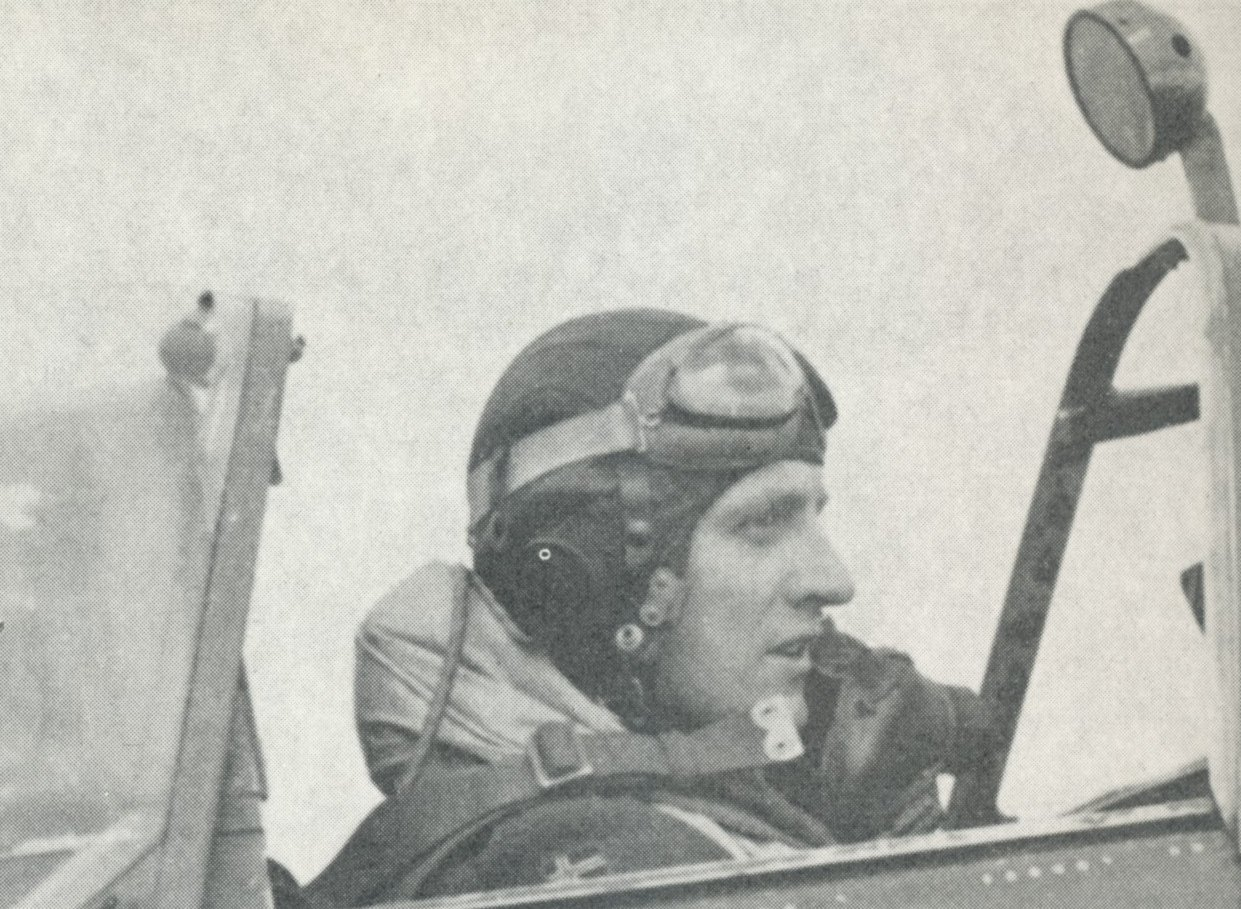
Helge Mehre, 1941

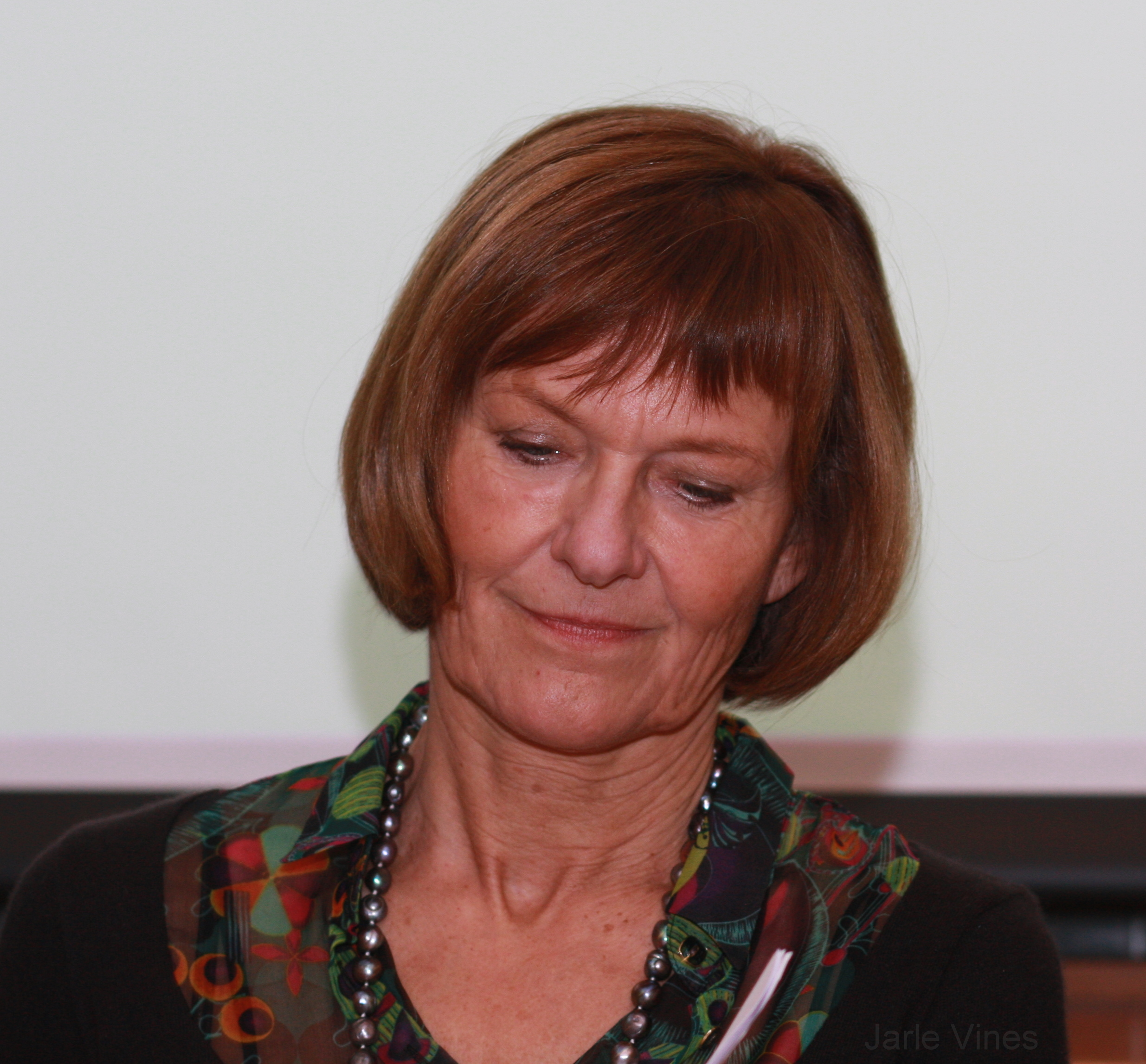
Gro Brækken, 2010

- Theodor Broch (1904–1998), a lawyer and politician who was Mayor of Narvik 1934 to 1946, except during WWII
- Helge Mehre MBE DSO DFC (1911–1997), a Norwegian military officer
- Fredrik Kiil (1921–2015), a physician who improved the artificial kidney
- Cissi Klein (1929 in Narvik – 1943 in Auschwitz), a Norwegian-Jewish girl, victim of the Holocaust
- Dr. Jan Paulsen (born 1935), a Seventh-day Adventist Church leader, past president of the General Conference of Seventh-day Adventists
- Jack Berntsen (1940–2010), a philologist, songwriter and folk singer
- Thorgeir Stubø (1943–1986), a jazz musician and composer, had a family of jazz musicians
- Terje Bjørklund (born 1945), a jazz pianist and composer
- Gro Brækken (born 1952), a businessperson, has chaired several public bodies
- Lise Haavik (born 1962), a Danish-Norwegian singer, sang at the 1986 Eurovision Song Contest
- Anne Rydning (born 1965), a Colonel in the Norwegian army who was the first female Army chief in Afghanistan
- Vibeke Larsen (born 1971 in Vassdalen), a Norwegian-Sami politician

=== Sport ===
- Per Willy Guttormsen (born 1942), a former speed skater who competed in the 1964, 1968, and 1972 Winter Olympics
- Thomas Hafstad (born 1974), a retired footballer who played 239 games for Tromsø IL
- Ragnhild Gulbrandsen (born 1977), a journalist and former football striker with 80 caps for Norway
- Marit Røsberg Jacobsen (born 1994), a handball player

== Twin towns – sister cities ==
Narvik is twinned with:

- Kikinda, Serbia
- Kingisepp, Russia
- Kiruna, Sweden
- Nowy Sącz, Poland
- Rovaniemi, Finland
