= Efjorden =

Fjord in Nordland, Norway

Efjorden (Norwegian); Áhtávuodna (Lule Sami)
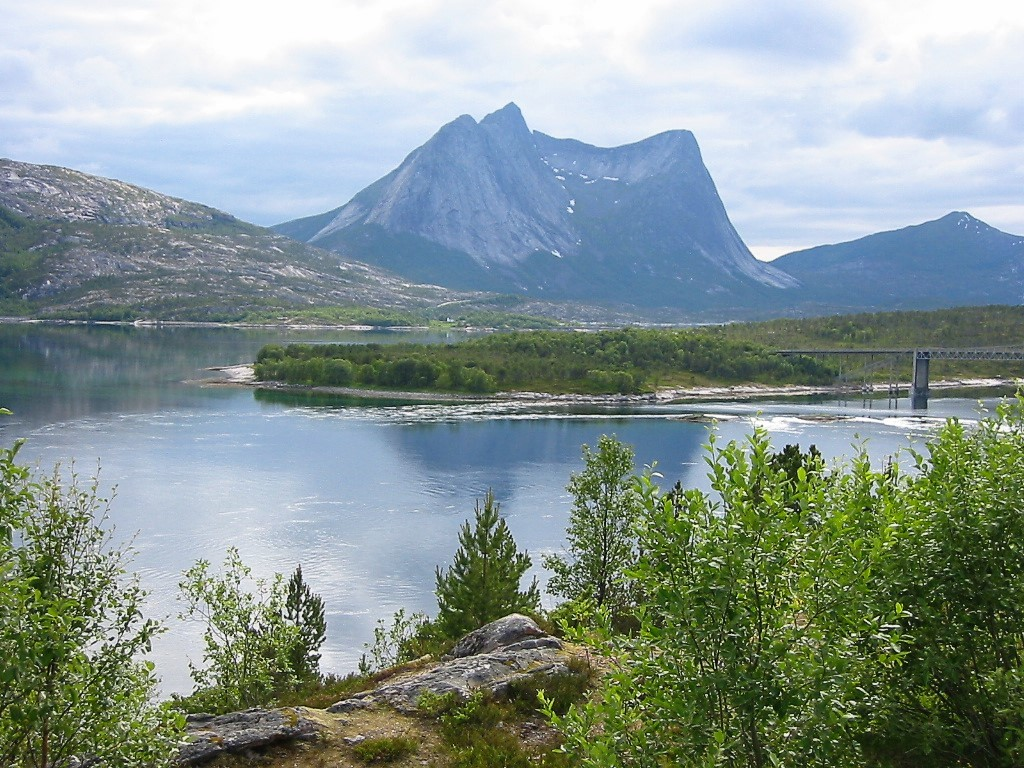
- View of the fjord
- Interactive map of the fjord
- Location: Nordland county, Norway
- Coordinates: 68.1790°N 16.7087°E
- Type: Fjord
- Primary outflows: Ofotfjorden
- Basin countries: Norway
- Max. length: 35 kilometres (22 mi)

Efjorden (Norwegian) or Áhtávuodna (Lule Sami) is a fjord in Narvik Municipality in Nordland county, Norway. It is an arm off of the main Ofotfjorden, stretching about 35 kilometres (22 mi) to the south. The Efjord Bridges on the European route E06 highway cross the fjord heading east on the way to the town of Narvik. The Norwegian National Road 827 follows the western shore of the fjord from the E6 highway heading south to the Efjord Tunnel which leads towards the village of Kjøpsvik.

== See also ==
- List of Norwegian fjords
