= Ballangen (village) =

Village in Narvik Municipality, Norway

Ballangen Ballangen (Norwegian) Bálák (Northern Sami)
- Village
- Interactive map of Ballangen
- Location within Nordland Location within Norway
- Coordinates: 68.3429°N 16.8314°E
- Country: Norway
- Region: Northern Norway
- County: Nordland
- District: Ofoten
- Municipality: Narvik Municipality

Area
  - Total: 1.01 km^{2} (0.39 sq mi)
- Elevation: 14 m (46 ft)

Population (2023)
  - Total: 817
  - Density: 809/km^{2} (2,100/sq mi)
- Time zone: UTC+01:00 (CET)
  - Summer (DST): UTC+02:00 (CEST)
- Post Code: 8540 Ballangen

Ballangen (Norwegian) or Bálák (Northern Sami) is a village in Narvik Municipality in Nordland county, Norway. The village is located at the western end of the Ballangen fjord, a small branch off the main Ofotfjorden. The European route E06 highway runs through the village. It is the main north-south route in Northern Norway.

The 1.01-square-kilometre (250-acre) village has a population (2023) of 817 and a population density of 809 inhabitants per square kilometre (2,100/sq mi).

The village economy is centered around the government services for the municipality as well as some manufacturing industry. Just outside the village is Ballangen Museum, which presents the extensive mining activity that has been in Ballangen since the 17th century. The village was the administrative centre of the old Ballangen Municipality until 2020 when it was merged into Narvik Municipality.
