= Ofoten Municipality =

Former municipality in Nordland, Norway

Ofoten Municipality Ofoten herred
- Former municipality
- Nordland within Norway

- Ofoten within Nordland
- Coordinates: 68.4363°N 17.3983°E
- Country: Norway
- County: Nordland
- District: Ofoten
- Established: 1 Jan 1838
  - Created as: Formannskapsdistrikt
- Disestablished: 1 Jan 1884
  - Succeeded by: Ankenes Municipality and Evenes Municipality
- Administrative centre: Narvik

Government
  - Mayor: Bertheus Normann (1882-1884)

Area (upon dissolution)
  - Total: 2,998.3 km^{2} (1,157.7 sq mi)
- Highest elevation: 1,893.7 m (6,213 ft)

Population (1884)
  - Total: 4,131
  - Density: 1.378/km^{2} (3.568/sq mi)
- Demonym: Ofoting
- Time zone: UTC+01:00 (CET)
  - Summer (DST): UTC+02:00 (CEST)
- ISO 3166 code: NO-1853

Ofoten is a former municipality in Nordland county, Norway. The 2,998.3-square-kilometre (1,157.7 sq mi) municipality existed from 1838 until its dissolution in 1884. The municipality included the areas on both sides of the inner part of the Ofotfjorden mostly in what is now Narvik Municipality and Evenes Municipality. The administrative centre of Ofoten was the village of Narvik (which later became a town in 1902). After the municipality was dissolved in 1884, the name Ofoten has been used to refer to the region that once was this municipality.

== General information ==
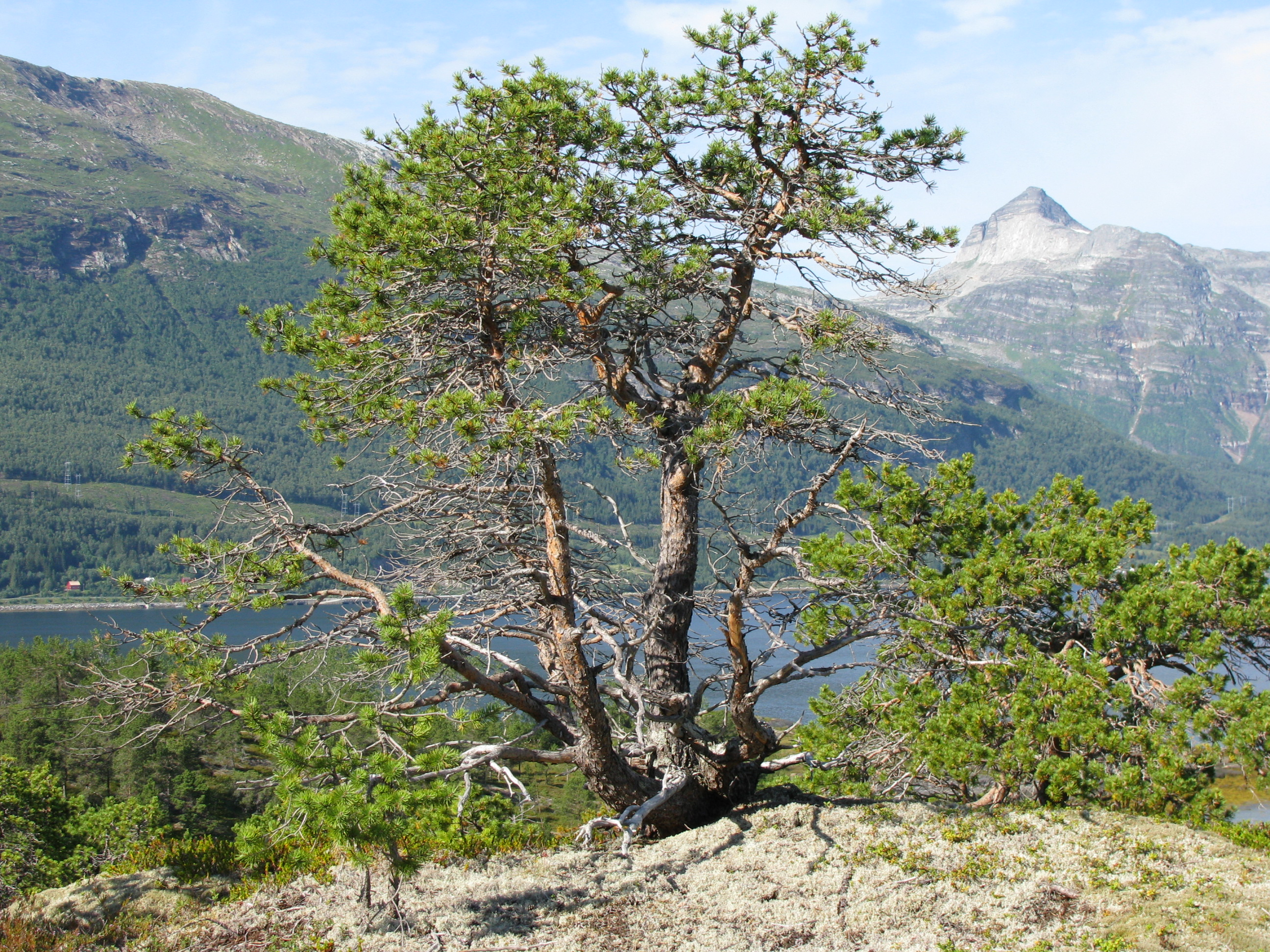
View of the Ofoten area

The municipality of Ofoten was established on 1 January 1838 (see formannskapsdistrikt law). On 1 January 1884, the municipality ceased to exist when it was split into two: Ankenes Municipality (population: 1,734) in the east and Evindnæs Municipality (population: 2,397) in the west.

=== Name ===
The municipality (originally the parish) is named after the local Ofotfjorden (Old Norse: Ófóti) since the fjord is the central feature of the area as well as the name of the whole Ofoten region. The first element of the name has an uncertain meaning. The last element is fótr which means "foot". The oldest form of the name could have been Úffóti. In this case, the first element is úfr which means "Eurasian eagle-owl". The three inner branches of the Ofotfjord might have been compared with the three claws of an owl.

=== Churches ===
The Church of Norway had one parish (sokn) within Ofoten Municipality. At the time of the municipal dissolution, it was part of the Ofoten prestegjeld and the Nordre Salten prosti (deanery) in the Diocese of Sør-Hålogaland.

Churches in Ofoten Municipality
| Parish (sokn) | Church name | Location of the church | Year built |
|---|---|---|---|
| Ankenes | Ankenes Church | Ankenesstranda | 1867 |
| Evenes | Evenes Church | Evenes | 1800 |

== Geography ==
The highest point in the municipality is the 1,893.7-metre (6,213 ft) tall mountain Storsteinsfjellet. The municipality was located at the inner part of the Ofotfjorden, along the border with Sweden (to the east and south). To the west was Lødingen Municipality and Tjeldsund Municipality. To the north was Ibestad Municipality and Bardu Municipality (both in Troms county).

== Government ==
While it existed, Ofoten Municipality was governed by a municipal council of directly elected representatives. The mayor was indirectly elected by a vote of the municipal council.

=== Mayors ===
The mayor (Norwegian: ordfører) of Ofoten Municipality was the political leader of the municipality and the chairperson of the municipal council. Here is a list of people who held this position:

- 1838–1844: Johan Klitzing Iversen
- 1844–1846: Unknown
- 1846–1848: Johan Klitzing Iversen
- 1848–1852: Peder Slangerup Schjønning
- 1852–1854: Unknown
- 1854–1856: Johan Klitzing Iversen
- 1857–1858: Martinius P. Hønich Jensen
- 1859–1866: Johan Christian Dahlsen
- 1867–1872: Hans Olai Christoffersen
- 1873–1875: Johan T.S. Østberg
- 1875–1881: Esten A. Osmark
- 1882–1884: Bertheus Normann

== See also ==
- List of former municipalities of Norway
- Ofoten - a geographical area within Nordland county
