= Liland, Evenes =

Village in Evenes Municipality, Norway

Liland, Evenes Liland (Norwegian) Lidaláddi (Northern Sami)
- Village
- Interactive map of Liland, Evenes
- Location within Nordland Location within Norway
- Coordinates: 68.4761°N 16.8840°E
- Country: Norway
- Region: Northern Norway
- County: Nordland
- District: Ofoten
- Municipality: Evenes Municipality

Area
  - Total: 0.3 km^{2} (0.12 sq mi)
- Elevation: 9 m (30 ft)

Population (2023)
  - Total: 315
  - Density: 1,050/km^{2} (2,700/sq mi)
- Time zone: UTC+01:00 (CET)
  - Summer (DST): UTC+02:00 (CEST)
- Post Code: 8534 Liland

Liland (Norwegian) or Lidaláddi (Northern Sami) is a village in Evenes Municipality in Nordland county, Norway. The village is located along the shore of the Ofotfjorden, about 10 kilometres (6.2 mi) southwest of the village of Bogen. The European route E10 highway passes just north of the village.

The 0.3-square-kilometre (74-acre) village has a population (2023) of 315 and a population density of 1,050 inhabitants per square kilometre (2,700/sq mi).
