= Ankenes Municipality =

Former municipality in Nordland, Norway

Ankenes Municipality Ankenes herred
- Former municipality
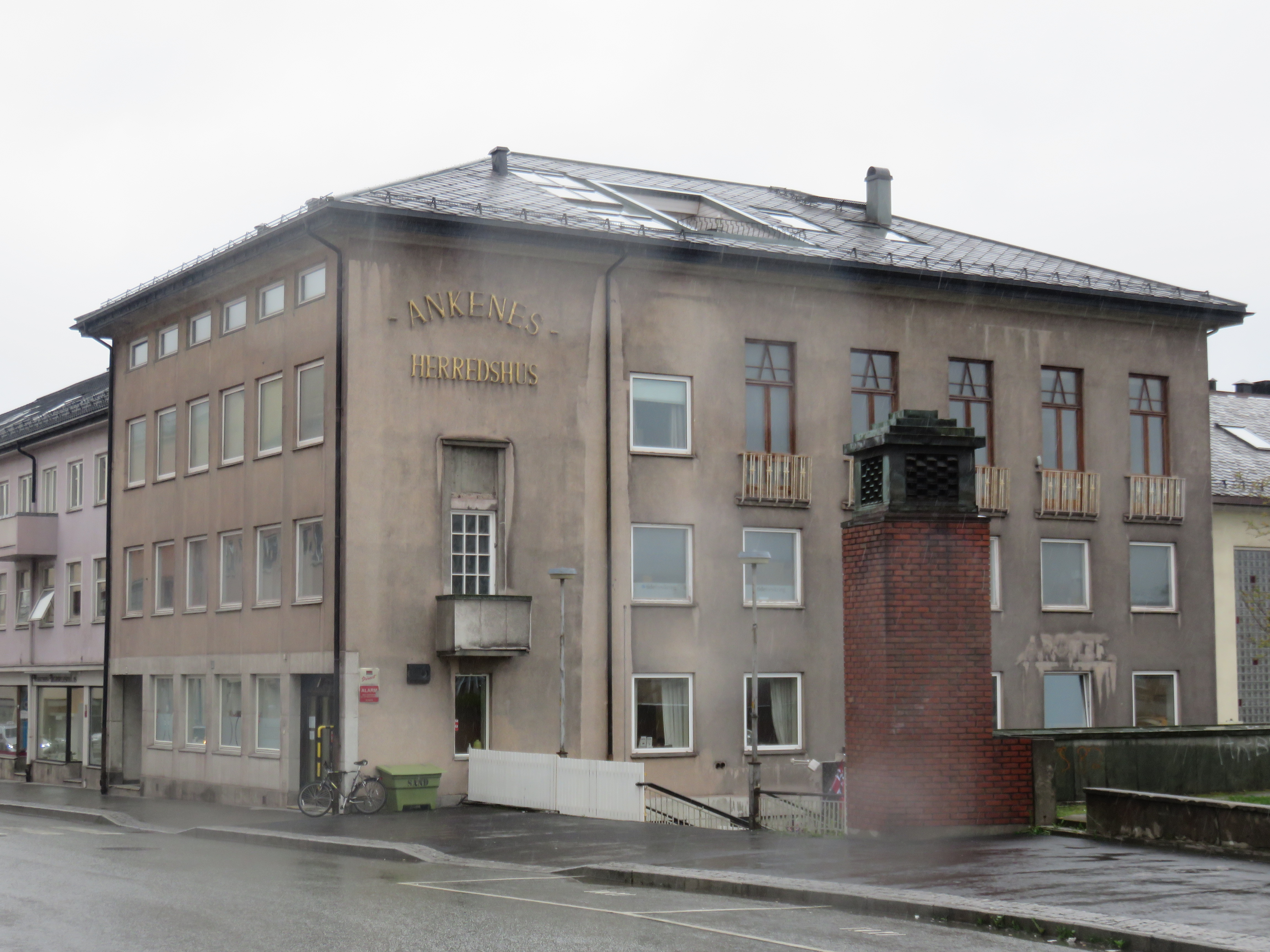
- View of the old Ankenes Herredshus (municipal government building)

- Nordland within Norway

- Ankenes within Nordland
- Coordinates: 68°25′16″N 17°22′11″E
- Country: Norway
- County: Nordland
- District: Ofoten
- Established: 1 Jan 1884
  - Preceded by: Ofoten Municipality
- Disestablished: 1 Jan 1974
  - Succeeded by: Narvik Municipality
- Administrative centre: Ankenesstrand

Government
  - Mayor (1972–1973): Edgar Sneve (Ap)

Area (upon dissolution)
  - Total: 2,028 km^{2} (783 sq mi)
  - Rank: #31 in Norway
- Highest elevation: 1,893.7 m (6,213 ft)

Population (1973)
  - Total: 7,025
  - Rank: #139 in Norway
  - Density: 3.5/km^{2} (9.1/sq mi)
  - Change (10 years): ▲ +15.7%
- Demonym: Ankenesværing

Official language
  - Norwegian form: Neutral
- Time zone: UTC+01:00 (CET)
  - Summer (DST): UTC+02:00 (CEST)
- ISO 3166 code: NO-1855

Ankenes is a former municipality in Nordland county, Norway. The 2,028-square-kilometre (783 sq mi) municipality existed from 1884 until 1974. It encompassed most of the present-day Narvik Municipality, surrounding of the town of Narvik which was once its own municipality. The administrative centre of Ankenes was the village of Ankenesstrand, situated along the west side of the Beisfjorden, where the Ankenes Church is located.

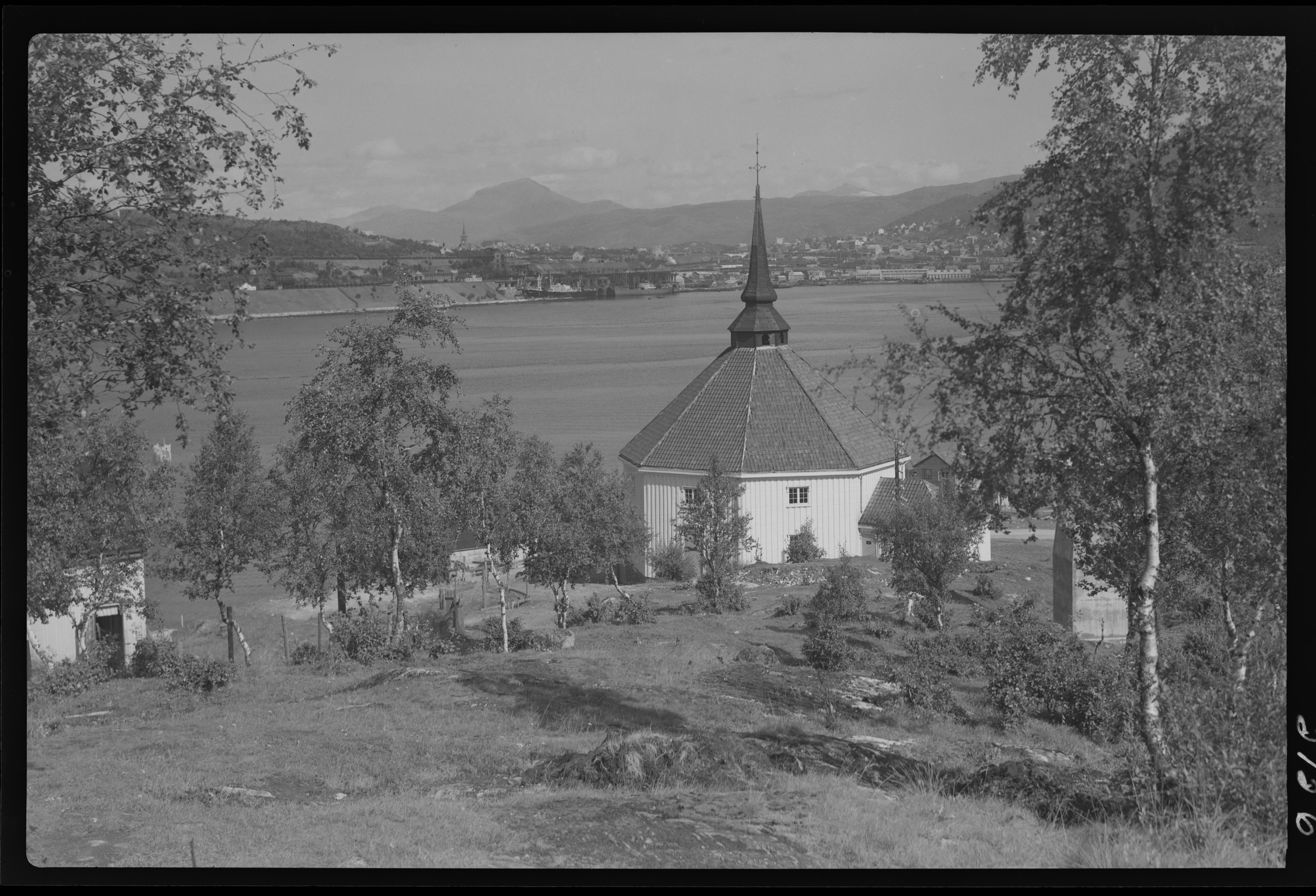
View of Ankenes Church c. 1950

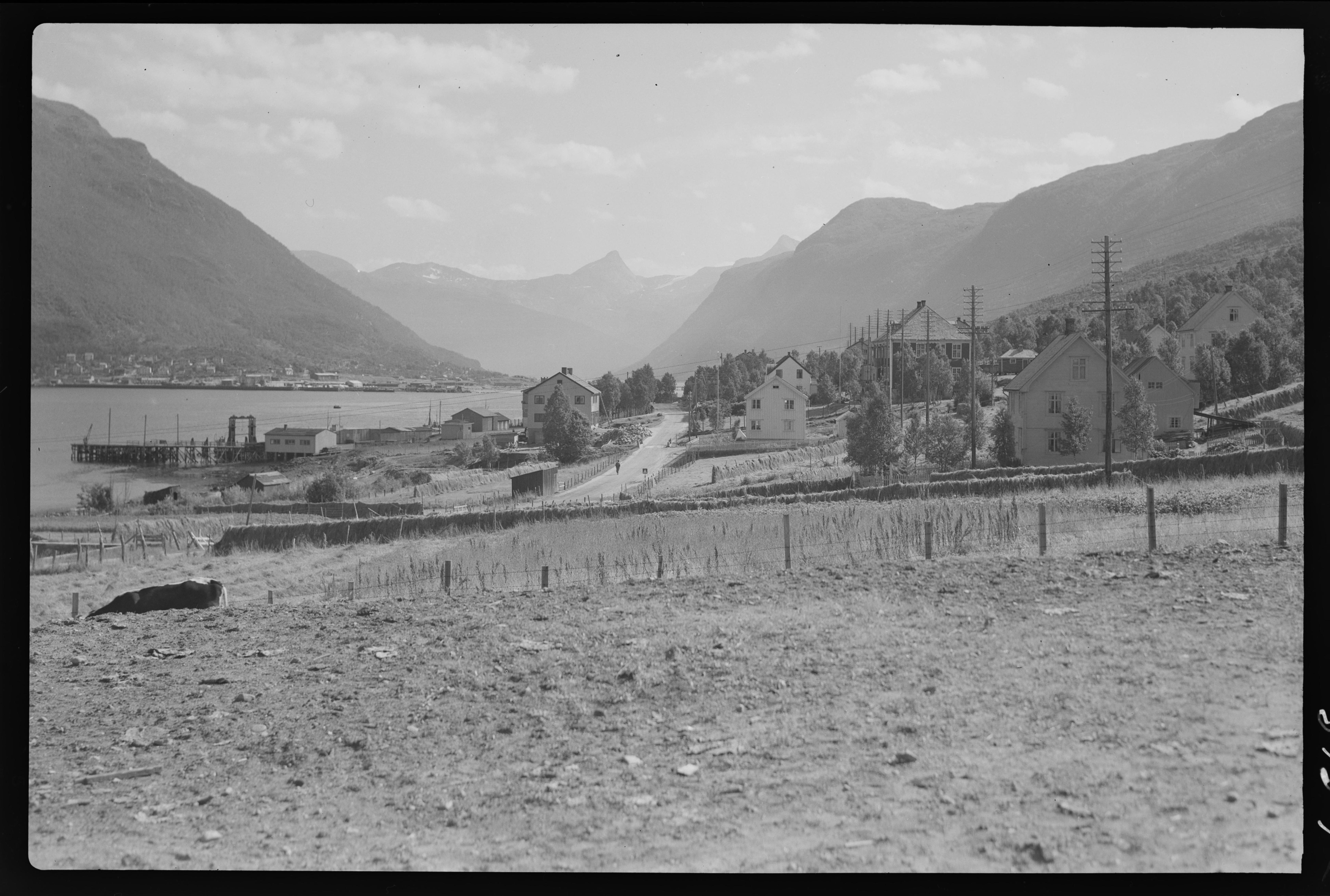
View of Ankenes c. 1950

Prior to its dissolution on 1 January 1974, the 2,028-square-kilometre (783 sq mi) municipality was the 31st largest by area out of the 444 municipalities in Norway. Ankenes Municipality was the 139th most populous municipality in Norway with a population of about 7,025. The municipality's population density was 3.5 inhabitants per square kilometre (9.1/sq mi) and its population had increased by 15.7% over the previous 10-year period.

Today, the name Ankenes is often used to refer to the suburban Ankenesstrand area, just west of the centre of the town of Narvik. The European route E6 highway is the main thoroughfare through Ankenesstrand and it follows the shoreline of the Ofotfjorden and Beisfjorden and it then crosses the fjord over the 375-metre (1,230 ft) long Beisfjord Bridge where it then reaches the central part of the town of Narvik.

== General information ==
The old Ofoten Municipality was established on 1 January 1838 (see formannskapsdistrikt law). Ofoten Municipality included all of the land surrounding the inner part of the Ofotfjorden, including the Ankenes area. On 1 January 1884, Ofoten Municipality was dissolved and split into two municipalities: Ankenes Municipality (population: 1,734) and Evindnæs Municipality (population: 2,397). In 1901, the Narvik (population: 3,705) received town status as a kjøpstad. Soon after, on 1 January 1902, the new town of Narvik was separated from Ankenes Municipality to form a separate municipality of its own. The split left Ankenes Municipality with a population of 3,023. On 1 January 1974, Ankenes Municipality was merged with the town of Narvik to form a new, larger Narvik Municipality. Prior to the merger, Ankenes had 7,022 inhabitants and Narvik had 12,758.

=== Name ===
The municipality (originally the parish) is named after the old Ankenes farm since the first Ankenes Church was built there. The first element is derived from the diminutive form of the old male name Anki which is short for Arnkell. The last element is nes which means "headland".

=== Churches ===
The Church of Norway had one parish (sokn) within Ankenes Municipality. At the time of the municipal dissolution, it was part of the Ofoten prestegjeld and the Nordre Salten (deanery) in the Diocese of Sør-Hålogaland.

Churches in Ankenes Municipality
Parish (sokn)	Church name	Location of the church	Year built
Ankenes	Ankenes Church	Ankenesstrand	1867
Ankenes	Skjomen Church	Elvegården	1893

== Geography ==
The highest point in the municipality was the 1,893.7-metre (6,213 ft) tall mountain Storsteinsfjellet. The municipality was bordered by Sweden to the east and south; Ballangen Municipality and Evenes Municipality to the west; and Skånland Municipality, Gratangen Municipality, and Salangen Municipality to the north.

== Government ==
While it existed, Ankenes Municipality was responsible for primary education (through 10th grade), outpatient health services, senior citizen services, welfare and other social services, zoning, economic development, and municipal roads and utilities. The municipality was governed by a municipal council of directly elected representatives. The mayor was indirectly elected by a vote of the municipal council. The municipality was under the jurisdiction of the Hålogaland Court of Appeal.

=== Municipal council ===
The municipal council (Kommunestyre) of Ankenes Municipality was made up of 25 representatives that were elected to four year terms. The tables below show the historical composition of the council by political party.

Ankenes kommunestyre 1971–1973
Party name (in Norwegian)	Number of representatives
Labour Party (Arbeiderpartiet)	13
Conservative Party (Høyre)	3
Christian Democratic Party (Kristelig Folkeparti)	1
Centre Party (Senterpartiet)	6
Socialist People's Party (Sosialistisk Folkeparti)	1
Liberal Party (Venstre)	1
Total number of members:	25
Note: On 1 January 1974, Ankenes Municipality became part of Narvik Municipality.

Ankenes kommunestyre 1967–1971
Party name (in Norwegian)	Number of representatives
Labour Party (Arbeiderpartiet)	14
Conservative Party (Høyre)	4
Centre Party (Senterpartiet)	3
Socialist People's Party (Sosialistisk Folkeparti)	2
Liberal Party (Venstre)	2
Total number of members:	25

Ankenes kommunestyre 1963–1967
Party name (in Norwegian)	Number of representatives
Labour Party (Arbeiderpartiet)	15
Conservative Party (Høyre)	4
Christian Democratic Party (Kristelig Folkeparti)	1
Centre Party (Senterpartiet)	3
Socialist People's Party (Sosialistisk Folkeparti)	1
Liberal Party (Venstre)	1
Total number of members:	25

Ankenes herredsstyre 1959–1963
Party name (in Norwegian)	Number of representatives
Labour Party (Arbeiderpartiet)	14
Conservative Party (Høyre)	5
Communist Party (Kommunistiske Parti)	1
Christian Democratic Party (Kristelig Folkeparti)	3
Centre Party (Senterpartiet)	2
Total number of members:	25

Ankenes herredsstyre 1955–1959
Party name (in Norwegian)	Number of representatives
Labour Party (Arbeiderpartiet)	15
Conservative Party (Høyre)	3
Communist Party (Kommunistiske Parti)	1
Christian Democratic Party (Kristelig Folkeparti)	1
Farmers' Party (Bondepartiet)	3
Liberal Party (Venstre)	2
Total number of members:	25

Ankenes herredsstyre 1951–1955
Party name (in Norwegian)	Number of representatives
Labour Party (Arbeiderpartiet)	10
Conservative Party (Høyre)	3
Communist Party (Kommunistiske Parti)	1
Christian Democratic Party (Kristelig Folkeparti)	2
Farmers' Party (Bondepartiet)	5
Liberal Party (Venstre)	3
Total number of members:	24

Ankenes herredsstyre 1947–1951
Party name (in Norwegian)	Number of representatives
Labour Party (Arbeiderpartiet)	10
Communist Party (Kommunistiske Parti)	3
Christian Democratic Party (Kristelig Folkeparti)	2
Farmers' Party (Bondepartiet)	6
Liberal Party (Venstre)	3
Total number of members:	24

Ankenes herredsstyre 1945–1947
Party name (in Norwegian)	Number of representatives
Labour Party (Arbeiderpartiet)	10
Communist Party (Kommunistiske Parti)	4
Christian Democratic Party (Kristelig Folkeparti)	3
Farmers' Party (Bondepartiet)	4
Liberal Party (Venstre)	3
Total number of members:	24

Ankenes herredsstyre 1937–1941*
Party name (in Norwegian)	Number of representatives
Labour Party (Arbeiderpartiet)	13
Farmers' Party (Bondepartiet)	6
Liberal Party (Venstre)	5
Total number of members:	24
Note: Due to the German occupation of Norway during World War II, no elections were held for new municipal councils until after the war ended in 1945.

=== Mayors ===
The mayor (Norwegian: ordfører) of Ankenes Municipality was the political leader of the municipality and the chairperson of the municipal council. Here is a list of people who held this position:

- 1884–1916: Bertheus Normann
- 1917–1922: Peter Leiros (V)
- 1923–1928: Hans Peder Seinæs
- 1929–1934: Peter Leiros (V)
- 1935–1940: Magnus Edvardsen (Ap)
- 1941–1945: Harder Kristiansen (NS)
- 1945–1945: Magnus Edvardsen (Ap)
- 1946–1967: Ole Andreassen (Ap)
- 1967–1971: Henning Eidissen (Ap)
- 1972–1973: Edgar Sneve (Ap)

== Notable people ==
- Gunnar Emil Garfors (1900–1979), a Norwegian poet
- Ola Teigen (1937–1970), a politician for the Norwegian Labour Party
- Toralv Kollin Markussen (1895–1973), a politician for the Norwegian Communist Party

== See also ==
- List of former municipalities of Norway
