= Niingsvatnet =

Niingsvatnet (Norwegian); Meahccejávri (Northern Sami)
- Interactive map of the lake
- Location: Troms and Nordland
- Coordinates: 68.5729°N 17.0572°E
- Type: Reservoir
- Basin countries: Norway
- Max. length: 4 kilometres (2.5 mi)
- Max. width: 1.5 kilometres (0.93 mi)
- Surface area: 2.93 km^{2} (1.13 sq mi)
- Shore length^{1}: 13.46 kilometres (8.36 mi)
- Surface elevation: 508 metres (1,667 ft)
- References: NVE
- ^{1} Shore length is not a well-defined measure.

Niingsvatnet (Norwegian) or Meahccejávri (Northern Sami) is a Norwegian lake that lies high in the mountains on the border Evenes Municipality in Nordland county and Tjeldsund Municipality in Troms county.

The water from the lake flows through a pipe down to the hydroelectric powerstation near the village of Bogen in Evenes Municipality. The powerstation is owned by Evenes Kraftforsyning and is situated at almost 500 m (1,600 ft) lower than the lake Niingsvatnet. The water from the powerstation then flows into the Strandvatnet lake. A short river goes from Strandvatnet past the village of Bogen to the Ofotfjorden.

== See also ==
- List of lakes in Norway
- Geography of Norway
