= Evenes =

Evenes may refer to:

== Places ==
- Evenes Municipality, a municipality in Nordland county, Norway
- Evenes (village), a village within Evenes Municipality in Nordland county, Norway
- Evenes Air Station, a Norwegian military base in Evenes Municipality in Nordland county, Norway
- Evenes Church, a church in Evenes Municipality in Nordland county, Norway
