= Lakså, Evenes =

Lakså
- Village
- Interactive map of Lakså
- Location within Nordland Location within Norway
- Coordinates: 68°30′16″N 16°54′58″E
- Country: Norway
- Region: Northern Norway
- County: Nordland
- District: Ofoten
- Municipality: Evenes Municipality
- Elevation: 49 m (161 ft)
- Time zone: UTC+01:00 (CET)
  - Summer (DST): UTC+02:00 (CEST)
- Post Code: 8539 Bogen i Ofoten

Lakså (Northern Sami: Lakso) is a village in Evenes Municipality in Nordland county, Norway. It is located at the mouth of the river Lakselva, about 4 kilometers (2.5 mi) west of the village of Bogen.
