= Toralv =

Toralv is a Norwegian given name. Notable people with the given name include:

- Toralv Kollin Markussen (1895–1973), Norwegian politician
- Toralv Maurstad (1926–2022), Norwegian actor
- Toralv Øksnevad (1891–1975), Norwegian politician, journalist, newspaper editor, and radio personality
