= Arctic Race of Norway =

Norwegian cycling stage race

Race details
- Date: August
- Region: Norway
- English name: Arctic Race of Norway
- Discipline: Road
- Competition: UCI ProSeries
- Type: Stage race
- Organiser: Amaury Sport Organisation
- Race director: Claude Rach
- Web site: www.arctic-race-of-norway.com

History
- First edition: 2013
- Editions: 13 (as of 2026)
- First winner: Thor Hushovd (NOR)
- Most recent: Thomas Silva (URU)

The Arctic Race of Norway is an annual multiple stage bicycle race held in northern Norway. The first edition was in 2013, lasting four days from 8 August to 11 August. The organising partners are Amaury Sport Organisation (ASO) and Arctic Race of Norway (AS).

The race is an official UCI-sponsored event, and has been placed as part of the Europe Tour. The first two editions were rated as 2.1 events. From 2015 it was rated as a 2.HC event. The race became part of the new UCI ProSeries in 2020.

In 2026, the race started in Evenes and ended in Narvik.

== Winners ==
Year	Country	Rider	Team
2013	Norway	Thor Hushovd	BMC Racing Team
2014	Netherlands	Steven Kruijswijk	Belkin Pro Cycling
2015	Estonia	Rein Taaramäe	Astana
2016	Italy	Gianni Moscon	Team Sky
2017	Belgium	Dylan Teuns	BMC Racing Team
2018	Russia	Sergey Chernetskiy	Astana
2019	Kazakhstan	Alexey Lutsenko	Astana
2020	No race due to COVID-19 pandemic		
2021	Belgium	Ben Hermans	Israel Start-Up Nation
2022	Norway	Andreas Leknessund	Team DSM
2023	Great Britain	Stephen Williams	Israel–Premier Tech
2024	Denmark	Magnus Cort	Uno-X Mobility
2025	New Zealand	Corbin Strong	Israel–Premier Tech
2026	Uruguay	Guillermo Thomas Silva	XDS Astana Team

== Classifications ==
As of the 2023 edition, the jerseys worn by the leaders of the individual classifications are:

- Midnight Sun Jersey – Worn by the leader of the general classification.
- Blue Jersey – Worn by the leader of the points classification.
- Peacock Jersey – Worn by the leader of the climbing classification.
- Red and white Jersey – Worn by the best rider under 23 years of age on the overall classification.
- Viking Jersey (Red, white, and blue) – Worn by the stage's best team mate (as chosen by viewers/social media).
- Yellow number Jersey – Worn by the best team with the best performance in the general classification.
- Red number Jersey – Worn by the leader of the combativity classification.
