= Bogen Chapel =

Bogen Chapel may refer to:

- Bogen Chapel (Evenes), a chapel in Evenes Municipality in Nordland county, Norway
- Bogen Chapel (Steigen), a chapel in Steigen Municipality in Nordland county, Norway
