= Narvik (disambiguation) =

Narvik is a municipality in Nordland, Norway.

Narvik may also refer to:

== Narvik, Norway ==
- Narvik (town), the administrative center of the municipality
- Narvik Airport, Framnes (closed)
- Harstad/Narvik Airport, Evenes
- Narvik Station, a railway station
- Narvik Energi, an energy company
- Narvik University College, now part of University of Tromsø
- Narvik IK, an ice hockey team
- FK Narvik/Nor, a defunct association football club

== Ships ==
- Type 1936A-class destroyer, also known as Narvik-class destroyers
- HNoMS Narvik, ships of the Royal Norwegian Navy
- SS Narwik, Polish steamer named after Narvik

== Other uses ==
- Narvik: The Campaign in Norway, 1940, a board wargame simulating the German invasion of 1940
- Narvik Sirkhayev (born 1974), Russian footballer
- Narvik (film), a 2022 Netflix movie by Erik Skjoldbjærg

== See also ==
- Battles of Narvik, 1940 naval battles in Ofotfjord, Norway
- Narvik Shield, a World War II German military decoration
- Narvik Debate, or Norway Debate, a notable debate in the British House of Commons during World War II
- Radio Narvik
