= Evenes (village) =

Village in Evenes Municipality, Norway

Evenes (Norwegian); Evenášši (Northern Sami)
- Village
- Interactive map of: Evenes (Norwegian); Evenášši (Northern Sami)
- Location within Nordland Location within Norway
- Coordinates: 68.4588°N 16.6995°E
- Country: Norway
- Region: Northern Norway
- County: Nordland
- District: Ofoten
- Municipality: Evenes Municipality
- Elevation: 12 m (39 ft)
- Time zone: UTC+01:00 (CET)
  - Summer (DST): UTC+02:00 (CEST)
- Post Code: 8534 Liland

Evenes (Norwegian) or Evenášši (Northern Sami) is a village in Evenes Municipality in Nordland county, Norway. The village of Evenes is located along the northern shore of the Ofotfjorden, about 3 kilometres (1.9 mi) south of Harstad/Narvik Airport, Evenes and the European route E10 highway. The village is the location of the historic Evenes Church.

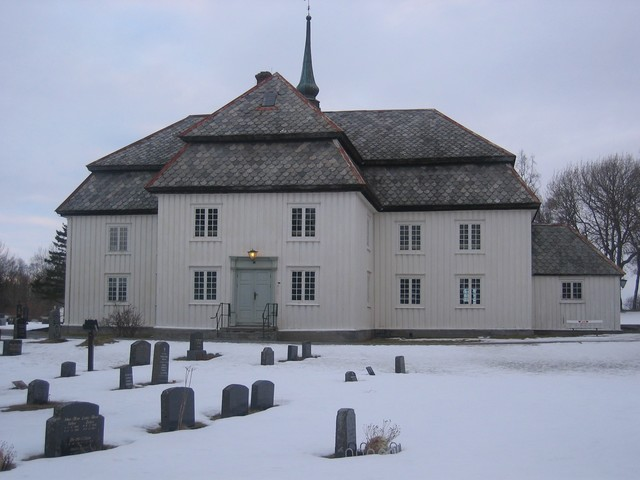
View of Evenes Church
