= Evenes Municipality =

Municipality in Nordland, Norway

Evenes Municipality Evenes kommune Evenášši suohkan
- Municipality
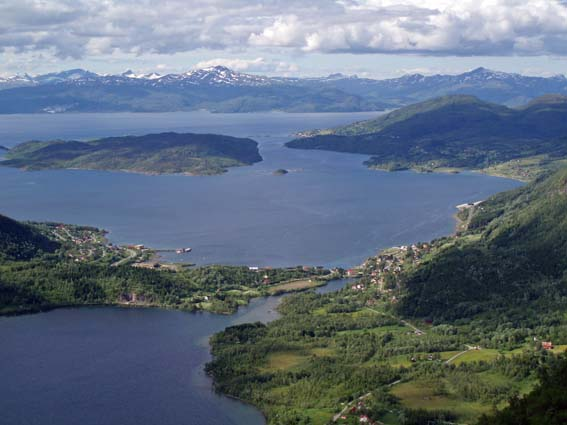
- View of Bogen in Evenes

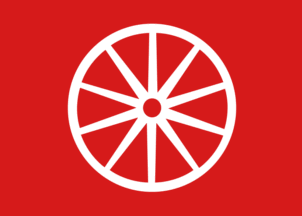
- Flag Coat of arms

- Nordland within Norway

- Evenes within Nordland
- Coordinates: 68°32′11″N 16°55′55″E
- Country: Norway
- County: Nordland
- District: Ofoten
- Established: 1 January 1884
  - Preceded by: Ofoten Municipality
- Administrative centre: Bogen i Ofoten

Government
  - Mayor (2019): Terje Bartholsen (Ap)

Area
  - Total: 252.79 km^{2} (97.60 sq mi)
  - Land: 241.48 km^{2} (93.24 sq mi)
  - Water: 11.31 km^{2} (4.37 sq mi) 4.5%
  - Rank: #286 in Norway
- Highest elevation: 1,134.43 m (3,721.9 ft)

Population (2024)
  - Total: 1,330
  - Rank: #312 in Norway
  - Density: 5.3/km^{2} (14/sq mi)
  - Change (10 years): ▼ −4.4%
- Demonym: Evenesværing

Official languages
  - Norwegian form: Bokmål
  - Sámi form: Northern Sami (semi-official)
- Time zone: UTC+01:00 (CET)
  - Summer (DST): UTC+02:00 (CEST)
- ISO 3166 code: NO-1853
- Website: Official website

Evenes (Norwegian) or Evenášši (Northern Sami) is a municipality in Nordland county, Norway. It is part of the traditional district of Ofoten. The administrative centre of the municipality is the village of Bogen. Other villages in Evenes include Liland, Tårstad, Dragvik, Lakså, and the village of Evenes.

The 253-square-kilometre (98 sq mi) municipality is the 286th largest by area out of the 357 municipalities in Norway. Evenes Municipality is the 312th most populous municipality in Norway with a population of 1,330. The municipality's population density is 5.3 inhabitants per square kilometre (14/sq mi) and its population has decreased by 4.4% over the previous 10-year period.

== General information ==
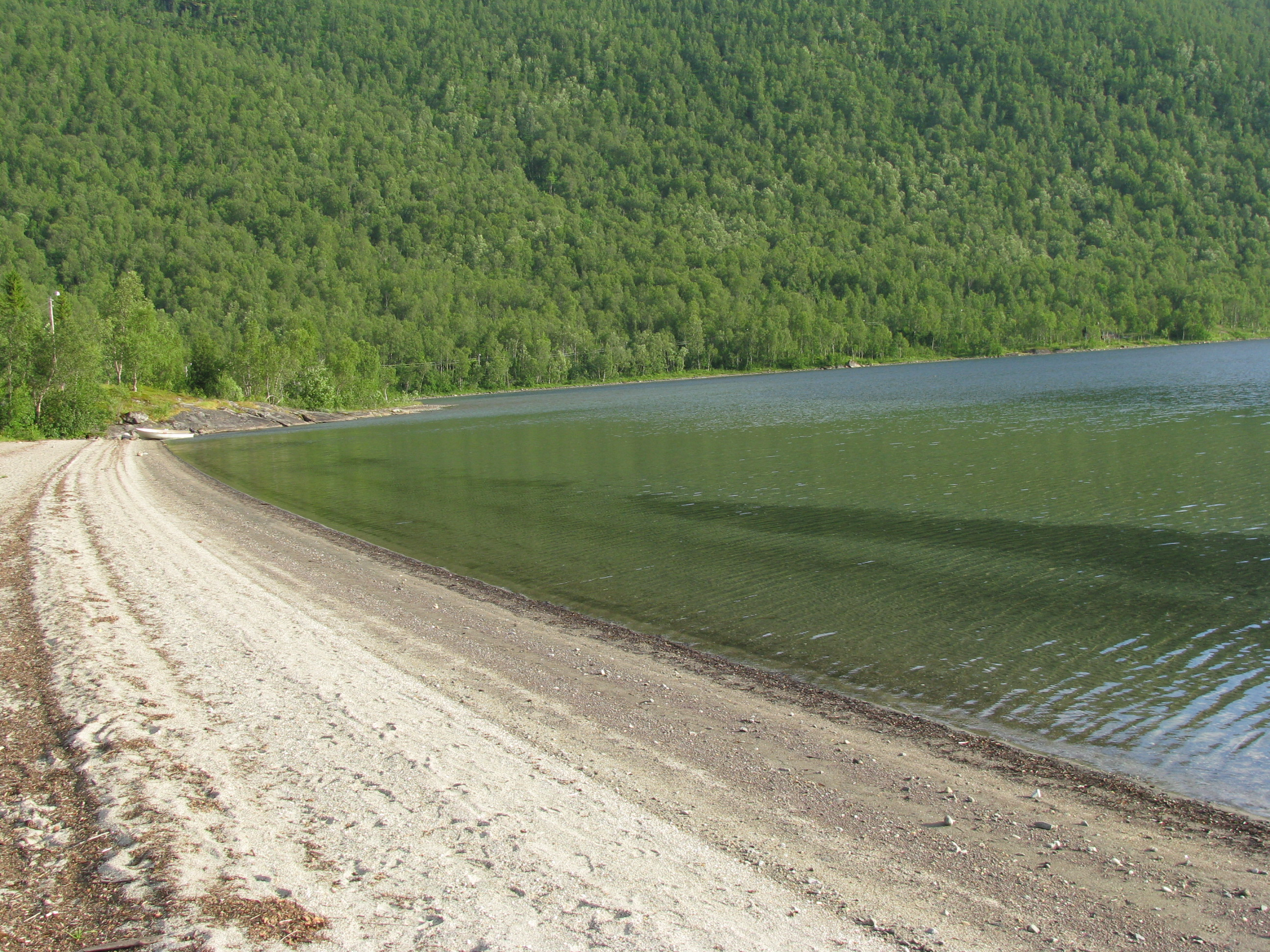
Part of Strandvatnet lake

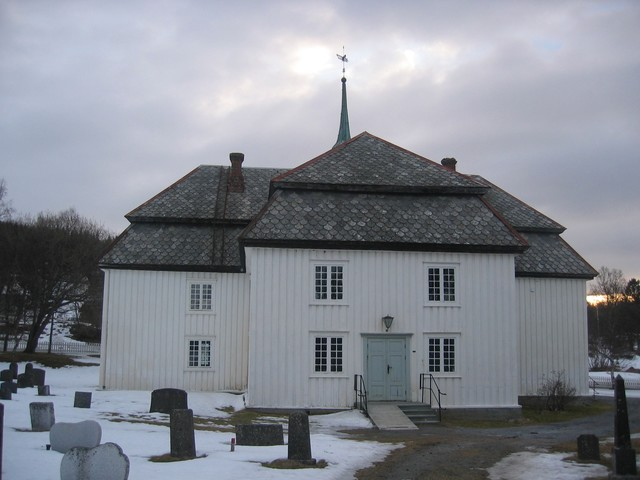
Evenes Church (2008)

The municipality of Evindnæs was established on 1 January 1884 when the old Ofoten Municipality was split into two new municipalities: Evindnæs Municipality and Ankenes Municipality. Initially, Evindnæs had 2,397 residents. The spelling was later changed from Evindnæs to Evenes. On 1 January 1912, the southern part of Trondenes Municipality in Troms county (population: 291) was transferred to Evenes (and Nordland county). On 1 July 1925, the southern district of Evenes on the south side of the Ofotfjorden (population: 3,270) was separated to become the new Ballangen Municipality. This left Evenes with 2,323 residents.

During the 1960s, there were many municipal mergers across Norway due to the work of the Schei Committee. On 1 January 1964, the small, unpopulated Ramnes area in western Evenes was transferred to the neighboring Tjeldsund Municipality. On 1 January 1999, the small Veggen area of Narvik Municipality (population: 9) was transferred to Evenes Municipality.

=== Name ===
The municipality (originally the parish) is named after the old Evenes farm (Old Norse: Øyvindarnes) since the first Evenes Church was built there. The first element is (probably) the genitive case of the male name Øyvindr. The last element is nes which means "headland". Historically, the name was spelled Evindnæs.

On 11 June 2021, the national government approved a resolution to add a co-equal, official Sami language name for the municipality: Evenášši. The spelling of the Sami language name changes depending on how it is used. It is called Evenášši when it is spelled alone, but it is Evenášši suohkan when using the Sami language equivalent to "Evenes municipality".

=== Coat of arms ===
The coat of arms was granted on 12 January 1990. The official blazon is "Gules, a wheel argent" (Norwegian: I rødt et sølv hjul). This means the arms have a red field (background) and the charge is a wagon wheel. The wheel has a tincture of argent which means it is commonly colored white, but if it is made out of metal, then silver is used. The wheel was chosen as a symbol for Evenes as a center of communication and transportation for the region. The arms were designed by Per Hartvigsen after the idea by Aina Heidal from Evenes.

=== Churches ===
The Church of Norway has one parish (sokn) within Evenes Municipality. It is part of the Ofoten prosti (deanery) in the Diocese of Sør-Hålogaland.

Churches in Evenes Municipality
Parish (sokn)	Church name	Location of the church	Year built
Evenes	Evenes Church	Evenes	1800
Evenes	Bogen Chapel	Bogen	1920

== Geography ==
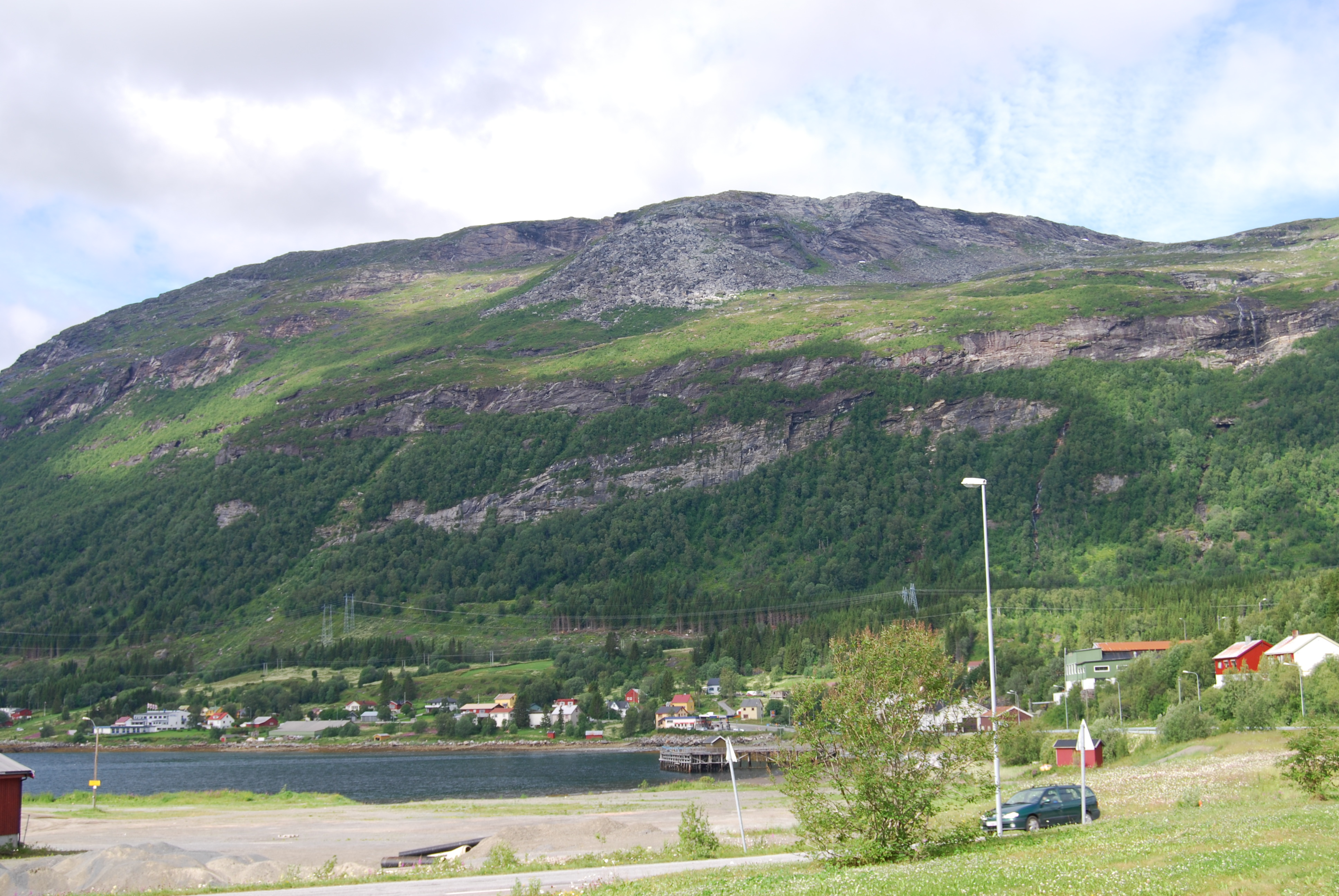
Bogen village in the mountainous eastern part of Evenes. Bogen bay is part of Ofotfjord.

Evenes is located on the northern shore of the Ofotfjorden, and borders Tjeldsund Municipality (in Troms county) to the west and north and Narvik Municipality to the east and south (across the fjord).

There are lowlands in the western part of the municipality (Liland and Evenes area), while in the eastern part (Bogen), the mountains go almost straight up from the fjord. The highest mountain is Litletinden (1,134.43 metres or 3,721.9 feet), which can be climbed without climbing equipment, even with skis in the winter and early spring. The view is stunning.

The most noticeable mountain when driving on the European route E10 highway, which crosses through Evenes, is perhaps the steep Niingen (1,090 metres or 3,580 feet) just east of Bogen. Strandvatnet lake next to Bogen village is surrounded by mountains and is a relatively rare Meromictic lake. There is trout in most lakes in Evenes, and Arctic char spawns in Østervikvatnet (lake) a few kilometres east of Bogen. Niingsvatnet is partly located in Evenes.

The large cave Trollkirka (lit. 'the Troll Church') is located in the western part of the municipality (near Tårstad). German fortifications from World War II can be seen at Evenestangen, which is also a good place for fishing in the fjord.

Evenestangen is also the site of the sculpture Stone House by Danish artist Bjørn Nørgaard. The sculpture is part of the Artscape Nordland project.

=== Climate ===
The weather station at Evenes airport has been recording since 1973, showing a boreal climate (Dfc/subarctic) with milder winters than typical for this climate zone. The all-time high 32.2 °C (90.0 °F) was recorded 18 July 2018. The warmest month on record was July 2014 with mean 17.9 °C (64.2 °F) and average daily high 23.4 °C (74.1 °F). The coldest month in recent decades was February 2007 with mean −7.9 °C (17.8 °F) and average daily low −12.6 °C (9.3 °F). The wettest season is autumn and winter and the driest is March - July, a pattern more typical of oceanic climates.

Climate data for Harstad/Narvik Airport, Evenes 1991-2020 (26 m, precipitation 1961-90, extremes 2002-2025)
Month	Jan	Feb	Mar	Apr	May	Jun	Jul	Aug	Sep	Oct	Nov	Dec	Year
Record high °C (°F)	10 (50)	8.4 (47.1)	11 (52)	19 (66)	27.9 (82.2)	29.6 (85.3)	32.2 (90.0)	30.8 (87.4)	25.5 (77.9)	19.1 (66.4)	13 (55)	10.1 (50.2)	32.2 (90.0)
Mean daily maximum °C (°F)	−2 (28)	−1 (30)	1 (34)	6 (43)	11 (52)	14 (57)	17 (63)	16 (61)	12 (54)	7 (45)	2 (36)	0 (32)	7 (45)
Daily mean °C (°F)	−3.5 (25.7)	−3.9 (25.0)	−2 (28)	1.8 (35.2)	6.4 (43.5)	10.1 (50.2)	13.3 (55.9)	12.2 (54.0)	8.5 (47.3)	3.5 (38.3)	0.2 (32.4)	−2.3 (27.9)	3.7 (38.6)
Mean daily minimum °C (°F)	−6 (21)	−6 (21)	−6 (21)	−1 (30)	4 (39)	7 (45)	10 (50)	9 (48)	6 (43)	2 (36)	−2 (28)	−4 (25)	1 (34)
Record low °C (°F)	−25.5 (−13.9)	−24 (−11)	−24.2 (−11.6)	−20.6 (−5.1)	−6.6 (20.1)	0.1 (32.2)	4.2 (39.6)	−0.3 (31.5)	−4.9 (23.2)	−9.8 (14.4)	−20.9 (−5.6)	−24.5 (−12.1)	−25.5 (−13.9)
Average precipitation mm (inches)	108 (4.3)	100 (3.9)	74 (2.9)	68 (2.7)	53 (2.1)	65 (2.6)	75 (3.0)	89 (3.5)	106 (4.2)	155 (6.1)	107 (4.2)	120 (4.7)	1,120 (44.1)
Source 1: Norwegian Meteorological Institute
Source 2: Weatheronline climate robot (avg highs/lows)

== Government ==
Evenes Municipality is responsible for primary education (through 10th grade), outpatient health services, senior citizen services, welfare and other social services, zoning, economic development, and municipal roads and utilities. The municipality is governed by a municipal council of directly elected representatives. The mayor is indirectly elected by a vote of the municipal council. The municipality is under the jurisdiction of the Midtre Hålogaland District Court and the Hålogaland Court of Appeal.

=== Municipal council ===
The municipal council (Kommunestyre) of Evenes Municipality is made up of 17 representatives that are elected to four-year terms. The tables below show the current and historical composition of the council by political party.

Evenes kommunestyre 2023–2027
Party name (in Norwegian)	Number of representatives
Labour Party (Arbeiderpartiet)	5
Progress Party (Fremskrittspartiet)	1
Conservative Party (Høyre)	3
Centre Party (Senterpartiet)	2
Socialist Left Party (Sosialistisk Venstreparti)	1
Evenes Cross-Party List (Evenes Tverrpolitiske Liste)	5
Total number of members:	17

Evenes kommunestyre 2019–2023
Party name (in Norwegian)	Number of representatives
Labour Party (Arbeiderpartiet)	5
Conservative Party (Høyre)	4
Centre Party (Senterpartiet)	3
Evenes Cross-Party List (Evenes Tverrpolitiske Liste)	5
Total number of members:	17

Evenes kommunestyre 2015–2019
Party name (in Norwegian)	Number of representatives
Labour Party (Arbeiderpartiet)	4
Progress Party (Fremskrittspartiet)	1
Conservative Party (Høyre)	7
Centre Party (Senterpartiet)	3
Socialist Left Party (Sosialistisk Venstreparti)	1
Liberal Party (Venstre)	1
Total number of members:	17

Evenes kommunestyre 2011–2015
Party name (in Norwegian)	Number of representatives
Labour Party (Arbeiderpartiet)	4
Progress Party (Fremskrittspartiet)	1
Conservative Party (Høyre)	9
Centre Party (Senterpartiet)	2
Socialist Left Party (Sosialistisk Venstreparti)	1
Total number of members:	17

Evenes kommunestyre 2007–2011
Party name (in Norwegian)	Number of representatives
Labour Party (Arbeiderpartiet)	5
Progress Party (Fremskrittspartiet)	2
Conservative Party (Høyre)	5
Centre Party (Senterpartiet)	3
Socialist Left Party (Sosialistisk Venstreparti)	2
Total number of members:	17

Evenes kommunestyre 2003–2007
Party name (in Norwegian)	Number of representatives
Labour Party (Arbeiderpartiet)	4
Progress Party (Fremskrittspartiet)	2
Conservative Party (Høyre)	4
Centre Party (Senterpartiet)	4
Socialist Left Party (Sosialistisk Venstreparti)	3
Total number of members:	17

Evenes kommunestyre 1999–2003
Party name (in Norwegian)	Number of representatives
Labour Party (Arbeiderpartiet)	5
Conservative Party (Høyre)	3
Centre Party (Senterpartiet)	7
Socialist Left Party (Sosialistisk Venstreparti)	2
Total number of members:	17

Evenes kommunestyre 1995–1999
Party name (in Norwegian)	Number of representatives
Labour Party (Arbeiderpartiet)	8
Conservative Party (Høyre)	2
Centre Party (Senterpartiet)	9
Socialist Left Party (Sosialistisk Venstreparti)	2
Total number of members:	21

Evenes kommunestyre 1991–1995
Party name (in Norwegian)	Number of representatives
Labour Party (Arbeiderpartiet)	6
Conservative Party (Høyre)	3
Centre Party (Senterpartiet)	5
Socialist Left Party (Sosialistisk Venstreparti)	1
Liberal Party (Venstre)	1
Evenesmark Cross-party List (Evenesmark Tverrpolitiske Liste)	1
Total number of members:	17

Evenes kommunestyre 1987–1991
Party name (in Norwegian)	Number of representatives
Labour Party (Arbeiderpartiet)	8
Conservative Party (Høyre)	3
Christian Democratic Party (Kristelig Folkeparti)	1
Centre Party (Senterpartiet)	3
Socialist Left Party (Sosialistisk Venstreparti)	1
Liberal Party (Venstre)	1
Total number of members:	17

Evenes kommunestyre 1983–1987
Party name (in Norwegian)	Number of representatives
Labour Party (Arbeiderpartiet)	9
Conservative Party (Høyre)	3
Christian Democratic Party (Kristelig Folkeparti)	1
Centre Party (Senterpartiet)	2
Liberal Party (Venstre)	1
Evenes independent party-politics list (Evenes partipolitisk uavhengiges liste)	1
Total number of members:	17

Evenes kommunestyre 1979–1983
Party name (in Norwegian)	Number of representatives
Labour Party (Arbeiderpartiet)	6
Conservative Party (Høyre)	3
Christian Democratic Party (Kristelig Folkeparti)	2
Centre Party (Senterpartiet)	3
Joint list of the Liberals and Independents (Venstre og uavhengige)	1
Evenes non-political list (Evenes upolitiske liste)	2
Total number of members:	17

Evenes kommunestyre 1975–1979
Party name (in Norwegian)	Number of representatives
Labour Party (Arbeiderpartiet)	7
Conservative Party (Høyre)	1
Christian Democratic Party (Kristelig Folkeparti)	1
Centre Party (Senterpartiet)	5
Joint list of the Liberals and Free Voters (Venstre og Frie Velgere)	1
Inner Evenes Non-party list (Indre Evenes Upolitisk liste)	2
Total number of members:	17

Evenes kommunestyre 1971–1975
Party name (in Norwegian)	Number of representatives
Labour Party (Arbeiderpartiet)	8
Centre Party (Senterpartiet)	6
Joint List(s) of Non-Socialist Parties (Borgerlige Felleslister)	3
Total number of members:	17

Evenes kommunestyre 1967–1971
Party name (in Norwegian)	Number of representatives
Labour Party (Arbeiderpartiet)	9
Centre Party (Senterpartiet)	4
Joint List(s) of Non-Socialist Parties (Borgerlige Felleslister)	3
Local List(s) (Lokale lister)	1
Total number of members:	17

Evenes kommunestyre 1963–1967
Party name (in Norwegian)	Number of representatives
Labour Party (Arbeiderpartiet)	7
Conservative Party (Høyre)	2
Centre Party (Senterpartiet)	4
Joint List(s) of Non-Socialist Parties (Borgerlige Felleslister)	3
Local List(s) (Lokale lister)	1
Total number of members:	17

Evenes herredsstyre 1959–1963
Party name (in Norwegian)	Number of representatives
Labour Party (Arbeiderpartiet)	7
Centre Party (Senterpartiet)	3
List of workers, fishermen, and small farmholders (Arbeidere, fiskere, småbrukere liste)	2
Joint List(s) of Non-Socialist Parties (Borgerlige Felleslister)	3
Local List(s) (Lokale lister)	2
Total number of members:	17

Evenes herredsstyre 1955–1959
Party name (in Norwegian)	Number of representatives
Labour Party (Arbeiderpartiet)	8
Christian Democratic Party (Kristelig Folkeparti)	3
Farmers' Party (Bondepartiet)	4
Local List(s) (Lokale lister)	2
Total number of members:	17

Evenes herredsstyre 1951–1955
Party name (in Norwegian)	Number of representatives
Labour Party (Arbeiderpartiet)	8
Joint List(s) of Non-Socialist Parties (Borgerlige Felleslister)	7
Local List(s) (Lokale lister)	1
Total number of members:	16

Evenes herredsstyre 1947–1951
Party name (in Norwegian)	Number of representatives
Labour Party (Arbeiderpartiet)	6
Communist Party (Kommunistiske Parti)	1
Joint List(s) of Non-Socialist Parties (Borgerlige Felleslister)	7
Local List(s) (Lokale lister)	2
Total number of members:	16

Evenes herredsstyre 1945–1947
Party name (in Norwegian)	Number of representatives
Labour Party (Arbeiderpartiet)	9
Joint List(s) of Non-Socialist Parties (Borgerlige Felleslister)	7
Total number of members:	16

Evenes herredsstyre 1937–1941*
Party name (in Norwegian)	Number of representatives
Labour Party (Arbeiderpartiet)	10
Joint List(s) of Non-Socialist Parties (Borgerlige Felleslister)	6
Total number of members:	16
Note: Due to the German occupation of Norway during World War II, no elections were held for new municipal councils until after the war ended in 1945.

=== Mayors ===
The mayor (Norwegian: ordfører) of Evenes Municipality is the political leader of the municipality and the chairperson of the municipal council. Here is a list of people who have held this position:

- 1884–1910: Jakob J. Anderssen (V)
- 1911–1919: Peter Lind Ingebrigtsen (LL)
- 1920–1925: John Magnus Østvik (Bp)
- 1925–1925: Hans Olsen Tofte (Bp)
- 1926–1928: Peter Lind Ingebrigtsen (LL)
- 1931–1934: Hans Olsen Tofte (Bp)
- 1935–1939: Kristian H. Lenvik (Ap)
- 1939–1940: Oscar Nikolai Jenssen (Ap)
- 1941–1945: Villas Ravn (NS)
- 1945–1947: Kristian Elvheim (Ap)
- 1948–1951: Sverre Agersborg (H)
- 1952–1955: Daniel Danielsen (Ap)
- 1956–1959: Kristian Andersen (Bp)
- 1960–1963: Ingvald Monsen (Ap)
- 1964–1967: Oddmund Lind (Sp)
- 1968–1968: Birger Persen (Ap)
- 1969–1971: Hans Ingemar Kristiansen (Ap)
- 1971–1978: Nilberg Andersen (Sp)
- 1978–1979: Rolf Moholt (Ap)
- 1979–1983: Arne Michalsen (H)
- 1983–1989: Rolf Moholt (Ap)
- 1989–1991: Bjørnar Olsen (Ap)
- 1991–2003: Brynjulf Hansen (Sp)
- 2003–2013: Jardar Jensen (H)
- 2013–2018: Svein Erik Kristiansen (H)
- 2018–2019: Sisilja Viksund (H)
- 2019–present: Terje Bartholsen (Ap)

== Economy ==
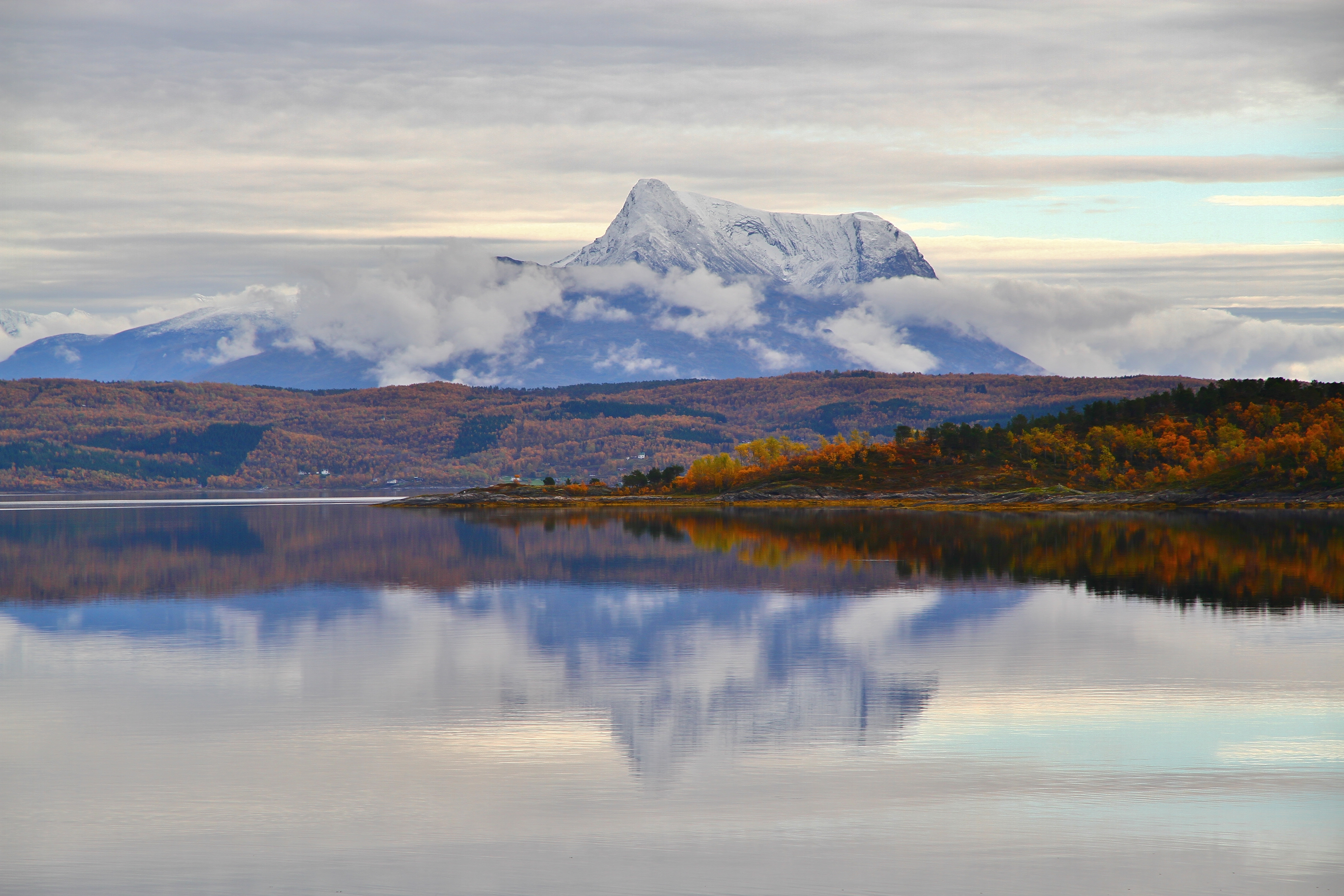
View from north of Bogen towards Kongsbakktinden mountain, 29. September 2010

Most people work in public services and there is also some small-scale agriculture.

Harstad-Narvik Airport (international airport) is located in the western part of the municipality, with daily flights to Oslo, Trondheim, Bodø, Tromsø and Andenes, as well as charter flights to southern Europe filled with sun-hungry tourists. The Royal Norwegian Air Force has a substantial infrastructure at Evenes, but the base was closed following the end of the Cold War, though it is often used by other NATO allies during their winter training. The large C-5 Galaxy from the United States Air Force has made several landings at the airport. A mobile hospital was built inside a small mountain at Osmarka, 5 kilometres (3.1 mi) east of the airport, using NATO infrastructure funds. The United States Navy moved the hospital to Kuwait before the Gulf War started in 1991. To achieve this, a large transport ship used the deep water harbour near Bogen, 13 kilometres (8.1 mi) east of the airport. This harbour was also built with funds from NATO, to enable heavy equipment to be moved north to Troms by road.

== History ==
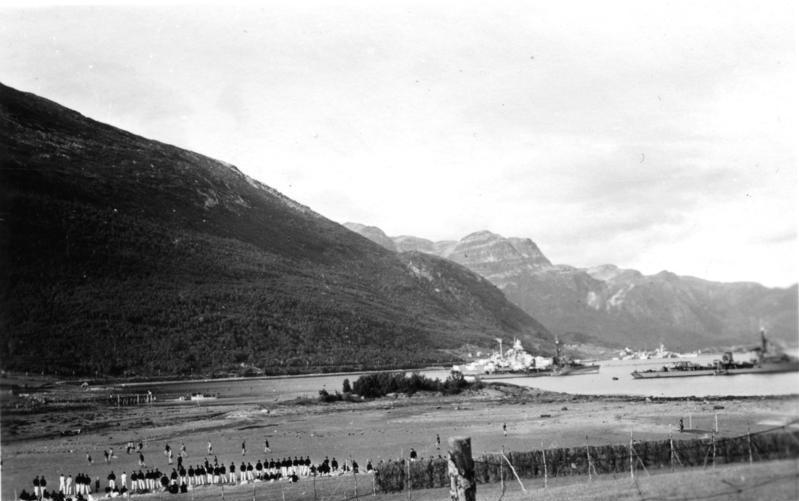
German warships, including Tirpitz, in Bogen bay, during WW2. Picture taken from west (Dragvik) towards Bogen. The mountains gave some protection from British bombers.

The Evenes Church was the first church in Ofoten, built about the year 1250. The original church and a subsequent church has been lost in fires; the present church is a wooden church (built in 1800) inspired by Danish Biedermeier mansion building style. Some relics from the original churches remain in the church today, most notably a stone baptismal font from the 13th century.

Liland used to be the commercial centre of the entire Ofotfjord area right up until the emergence of Narvik as a commerce/industry centre in the early 20th century.

During World War II, the Germans found the wide and fairly deep Bogen bay, with its mostly hard rock bottom well suited for anchoring, to be perfect for a naval base. Narvik is only 10 nautical miles (19 km) to the east (further into the fjord). The German battleship Tirpitz and cruiser Admiral Hipper were stationed in Bogen during part of the war (8 July – 23 October 1942, returned 11 March 1943). The battleships Scharnhorst and Lützow were based in Bogen for a shorter time. Additionally, several destroyers and submarines used Bogen as a base for shorter periods. Thus, this bay was one of Germany's most powerful naval bases during parts of the war and constituted a very real threat to Allied Arctic Convoys. The Allies had an obvious need for intelligence about these powerful German warships, and the British provided a radio set to the local resistance group. This radio was set up at Liland, 9 km west of Bogen, and codenamed Lyra.

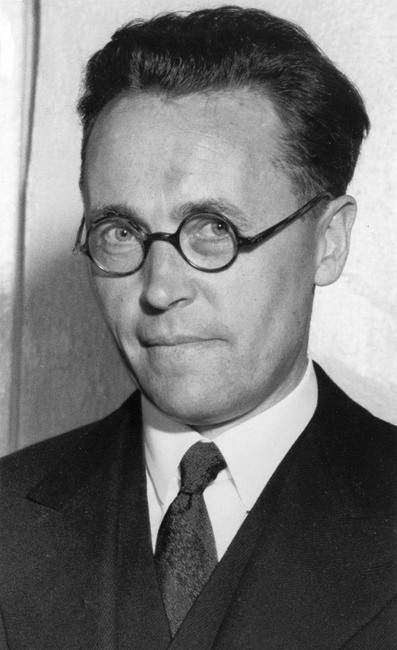
Terje Wold, c.1935

== Notable people ==
- Jens Martin Arctander Jenssen (1885 Evenes – 1968), a Norwegian politician, teacher, and librarian
- Terje Wold (1899 in Evenes – 1972), a Norwegian judge and politician who was the 15th Chief Justice of the Supreme Court of Norway from 1958 to 1969
- Alf Rekstad (born 1951 in Bogen), a speed skater who competed in the 10,000-meter race at the 1980 Winter Olympics
- Jens Fredrik Ryland (born 1974), a guitarist with the progressive black metal band Borknagar who was brought up in Evenes
