= HNoMS Narvik =

HNoMS Narvik is the name of the following ships of the Royal Norwegian Navy:

- HNoMS Narvik (L44), a Hunt-class destroyer launched in 1942 and originally in service with the Royal Navy as HMS Glaisdale, sold to Norway in 1946 and scrapped in 1962
- HNoMS Narvik (F304), an Oslo-class frigate launched in 1965, decommissioned in 2007, and preserved as a museum ship at the Royal Norwegian Navy Museum

== See also ==
- Narvik (disambiguation)
