= Alf Rekstad =

Norwegian speed skater

Personal information
- Born: 28 September 1951 (age 73); Bogen, Evenes, Norway

Sport
- Sport: Speed skating

Alf Martin Rekstad (born 28 September 1951 in Bogen, Evenes) is a Norwegian speed skater. He represented the club Ask Skøyteklubb. He competed in the 10,000 m at the 1980 Winter Olympics.
