= Ankenesstranda =

Village in Narvik Municipality, Norway

Ankenesstrand Ankenesstranda
- Village
- Interactive map of Ankenesstrand
- Location within Nordland Location within Norway
- Coordinates: 68.4214°N 17.3698°E
- Country: Norway
- Region: Northern Norway
- County: Nordland
- District: Ofoten
- Municipality: Narvik Municipality
- Elevation: 25 m (82 ft)
- Time zone: UTC+01:00 (CET)
  - Summer (DST): UTC+02:00 (CEST)
- Post Code: 8520 Ankenesstrand

Ankenesstranda or Ankenesstrand (often simply called "Ankenes") is a village area in Narvik Municipality in Nordland county, Norway. The village area is a western suburb of the town of Narvik and just east of the village of Håkvik. The village lies at the confluence of the large Ofotfjorden and the smaller Beisfjorden. The European route E06 highway runs through the village before crossing the Beisfjord Bridge into the town of Narvik. In 2016, there were about 3,000 inhabitants of the village.

The village was the administrative centre of the old Ankenes Municipality which existed from 1884 until 1974.

Ankenes Church is an octagonal church that was built in Ankenesstrand in 1842. Ankenes is also known for Millerjordbukta (the local shopping area), and the local football team SK Hardhaus. The local Ankenes Skiing Resort (Ankenes Alpinsenter) was built in 1972 and it has 8 runs and 2 lifts. In 1973, the Ankenes Alpine Club was also established.
