= Artscape Nordland =

International art project in Nordland, Norway

Coordinates: 66°01′42″N 12°41′38″E

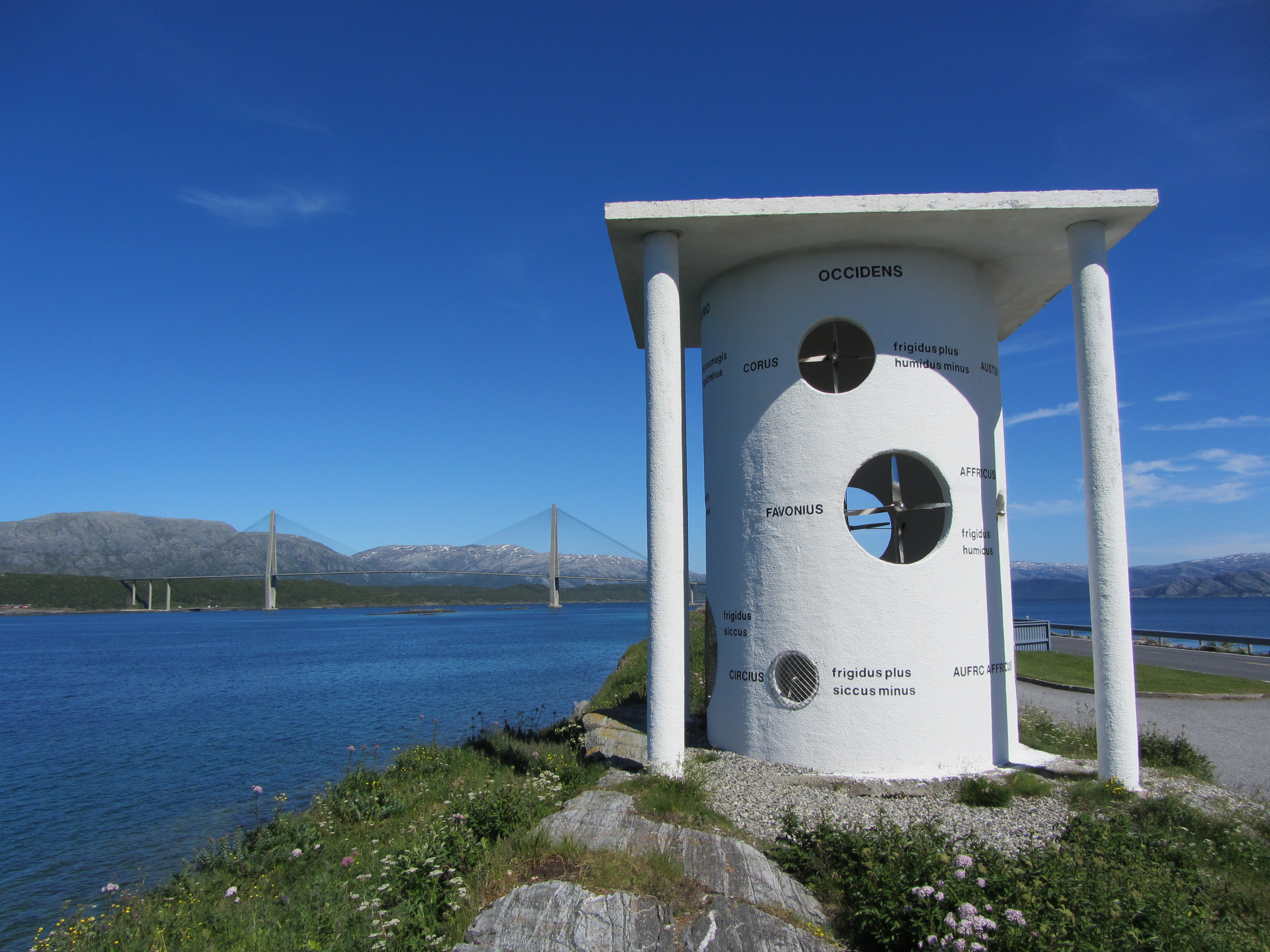
“House of the Winds” in Alstahaug Municipality

Artscape Nordland (Norwegian: Skulpturlandskap Nordland) is an international art project that aims to bring art to people where they live, art museums being few and far apart in the sparsely populated county of Nordland. The first phase of the project lasted from 1992 until 1998. The project included 33 sculptures by 33 artists from 18 different countries placed in 32 municipalities in Nordland county plus 1 municipality in Troms county. Additional artwork was installed in 2009, 2010, and 2015, bringing the total to 36 sculptures installed.

The project has been celebrated by the composers Kari Beate Tandberg and Karsten Brustad who working together wrote «Skulpturlandskap Nordland – en musikalsk dialog» ("Artscape Nordland: a musical dialogue").

== Participating Municipalities ==
Nordland county

- Alstahaug Municipality
- Andøy Municipality
- Ballangen Municipality
- Beiarn Municipality
- Bodø Municipality
- Brønnøy Municipality
- Bø Municipality
- Evenes Municipality
- Fauske Municipality
- Flakstad Municipality
- Gildeskål Municipality
- Hadsel Municipality
- Hamarøy Municipality
- Hattfjelldal Municipality
- Leirfjord Municipality
- Lødingen Municipality
- Meløy Municipality
- Moskenes Municipality
- Narvik Municipality
- Rana Municipality
- Røst Municipality
- Saltdal Municipality
- Skjerstad Municipality
- Sortland Municipality
- Sømna Municipality
- Tjeldsund Municipality
- Vefsn Municipality
- Vega Municipality
- Vestvågøy Municipality
- Vevelstad Municipality
- Vågan Municipality
- Øksnes Municipality

Troms county

- Skånland Municipality
