= Radio Narvik =

Norwegian radio station

Coordinates: 58°51′56″N 5°44′43″E

Radio Narvik was a local radio station which covered the whole Ofoten district, including Narvik, Ankenesstrand, Ballangen and Bjerkvik. The frequency was FM 103.5 and 105.5 in all areas. It was also possible to listen via internet radio.

In 2005 Radio Narvik was bought by the newspaper Fremover, becoming part of Jærradiogruppen AS. In December 2008, the radio station was closed down due to lack of income.
