= Bogen Chapel (Evenes) =

Church in Nordland, Norway

- Bogen kapell
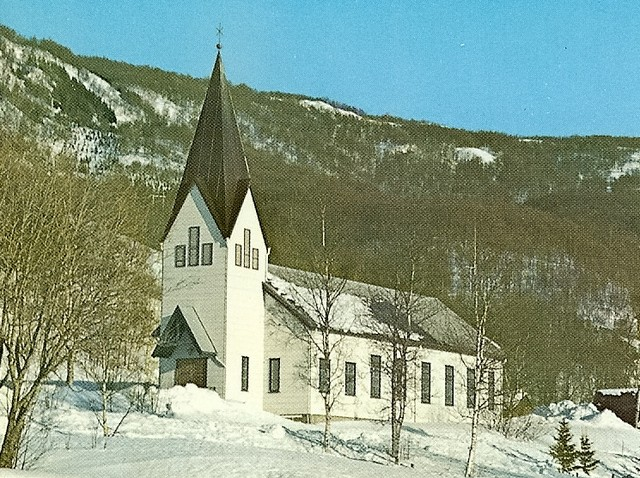
- View of the church
- Bogen Chapel
- 68.5162547°N 17.0051193°E
- Location: Evenes Municipality, Nordland
- Country: Norway
- Denomination: Church of Norway
- Churchmanship: Evangelical Lutheran

History
- Status: Parish church
- Founded: 1920
- Consecrated: 1920

Architecture
- Functional status: Active
- Architect: Bjarne Romsloe
- Architectural type: Long church
- Completed: 1920 (106 years ago)

Specifications
- Capacity: 260
- Materials: Wood

Administration
- Diocese: Sør-Hålogaland
- Deanery: Ofoten prosti
- Parish: Evenes
- Norwegian Cultural Heritage Site
- Type: Church
- Status: Not protected
- ID: 83921

Bogen Chapel (Norwegian: Bogen kapell) is a parish church of the Church of Norway in Evenes Municipality in Nordland county, Norway. It is located in the village of Bogen. It is one of two churches in the Evenes parish which is part of the Ofoten prosti (deanery) in the Diocese of Sør-Hålogaland. The white, wooden church was built in a long church style in 1920 using plans drawn up by the architect Bjarne Romsloe. The chapel seats about 260 people.

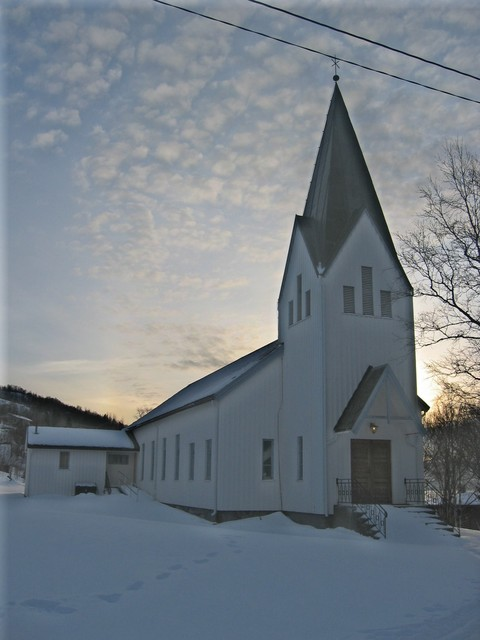
View of the church

== See also ==
- List of churches in Sør-Hålogaland
