= Toralv Kollin Markussen =

Norwegian politician

Representative 4 for the Market towns of Nordland, Troms and Finnmark
- In office 1945–1949

Personal details
- Born: 23 February 1895; Ankenes Municipality, Norway
- Died: 17 December 1973
- Political party: Norwegian Communist Party

Toralv Kollin Markussen (23 February 1895 – 17 December 1973) was a Norwegian politician for the Communist Party.

== Biography ==
Toralv Kollin Markussen was born in Ankenes Municipality on 23 February 1895. He held various positions in Narvik city council during the terms 1931–1934 and 1933–1937.

Markussen joined the central committee of the Norwegian Communist Party in 1936. In 1945 he was elected to the Norwegian Parliament as Representative 4 of the Market towns of Nordland, Troms and Finnmark. He was not re-elected in 1949. He died on 17 December 1973.
