= Evenes Church =

- Evenes kirke
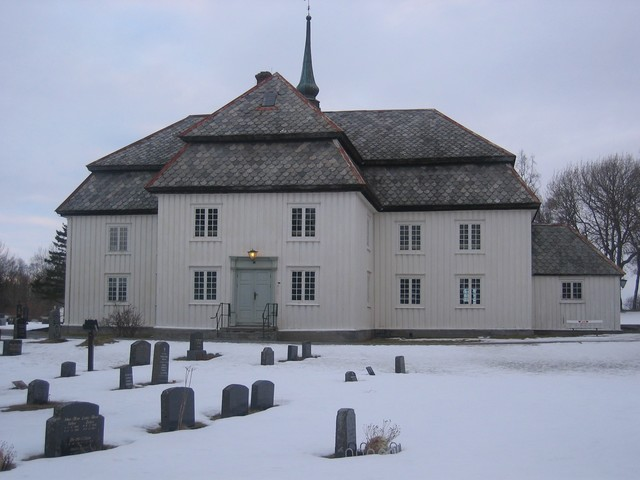
- View of the church
- Evenes Church
- 68.45987899°N 16.69870913°E
- Location: Evenes Municipality, Nordland
- Country: Norway
- Denomination: Church of Norway
- Churchmanship: Evangelical Lutheran

History
- Status: Parish church
- Founded: c. 1250
- Consecrated: 1800

Architecture
- Functional status: Active
- Architect: J.B. Kreutzer
- Architectural type: Cruciform
- Completed: 1800 (226 years ago)

Specifications
- Capacity: 460
- Materials: Wood

Administration
- Diocese: Sør-Hålogaland
- Deanery: Ofoten prosti
- Parish: Evenes
- Norwegian Cultural Heritage Site
- Type: Church
- Status: Listed
- ID: 84106

Evenes Church (Norwegian: Evenes kirke) is a parish church of the Church of Norway in Evenes Municipality in Nordland county, Norway. It is located in the village of Evenes, along the northern shore of the Ofotfjorden. It is the church for the Evenes parish which is part of the Ofoten prosti (deanery) in the Diocese of Sør-Hålogaland. The white, wooden church was built in a cruciform style in 1800 using plans drawn up by the architect Johan Bernhard Kreutzer. The church seats about 460 people.

== History ==
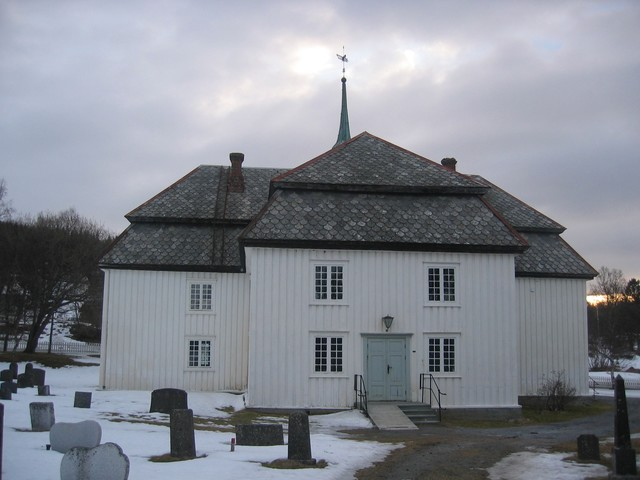
View of the church

The earliest existing historical records of the church date back to 1589, but the historical Saga of Haakon Haakonarson says that King Haakon IV of Norway built a church in Evenes around the year 1250. An old story about the church states that the King had one of his ships drop a log into the Ofotfjorden and where the log landed on the shore was where the church would be built. The log washed ashore at Eivindnæs so that is where the church was constructed.

Not much is known about the medieval buildings that housed the church in Evenes, but in 1652 it was described as a tall timber-framed church with a tower and an extended choir, however they also described the building as being dilapidated and in great need of repair. In 1676, the old church was torn down and a new church was constructed on the same site. The new building was a timber-framed church built with a cruciform floor plan, a sacristy in the east, entry porches in the west and south, and a small tower on the roof above the nave. Records from 1750 show that the church had a graveyard that was surrounded by a fence made out of peat.

In 1800, a new church was built to replace the old church. This building was designed in a Danish manor style with a Mansard roof. The new church was consecrated and put into use starting in 1800, but it wasn't fully completed until 1806. The old church was torn down and its materials sold in 1806.

In 1814, this church served as an election church (Norwegian: valgkirke). Together with more than 300 other parish churches across Norway, it was a polling station for elections to the 1814 Norwegian Constituent Assembly which wrote the Constitution of Norway. This was Norway's first national elections. Each church parish was a constituency that elected people called "electors" who later met together in each county to elect the representatives for the assembly that was to meet at Eidsvoll Manor later that year.

In 2000, the church was designated as the millennium site for the municipality of Evenes.

== See also ==
- List of churches in Sør-Hålogaland
