= Ankenes Church =

Church in Nordland, Norway

- Ankenes kirke
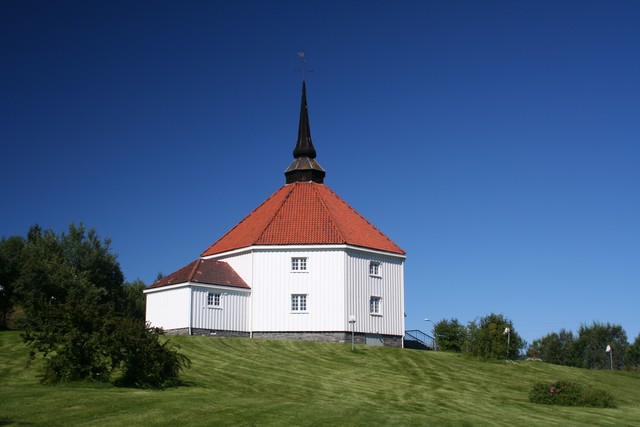
- View of the church
- Ankenes Church
- 68.4210097°N 17.3787710°E
- Location: Narvik Municipality, Nordland
- Country: Norway
- Denomination: Church of Norway
- Churchmanship: Evangelical Lutheran

History
- Status: Parish church
- Founded: 1652
- Consecrated: 26 Sept 1842

Architecture
- Functional status: Active
- Architect: Ingebrigt Julin
- Architectural type: Octagonal
- Completed: 1842 (184 years ago)

Specifications
- Capacity: 380
- Materials: Wood

Administration
- Diocese: Sør-Hålogaland
- Deanery: Ofoten prosti
- Parish: Ankenes
- Norwegian Cultural Heritage Site
- Type: Church
- Status: Automatically protected
- ID: 83784

Ankenes Church (Norwegian: Ankenes kirke) is a parish church of the Church of Norway in Narvik Municipality in Nordland county, Norway. It is located in the village of Ankenesstranda. It is the main church for the Ankenes parish which is part of the Ofoten prosti (deanery) in the Diocese of Sør-Hålogaland. The white, wooden church was built in an octagonal style in 1842 using plans drawn up by the architect Ingebrigt Julin. The church seats about 380 people.

== History ==
The first church in Ankenes was built around 1652-1661. Around 1730, the old church was torn down and a new church was rebuilt on the same site. Then in 1842, the old church was torn down and a new building was constructed on the same site. The new church was consecrated on 26 September 1842. In 1879-1880, the church was renovated and redecorated. In 1940, during World War II, the church was damaged during the fighting. It was repaired in 1947.

== Media gallery ==
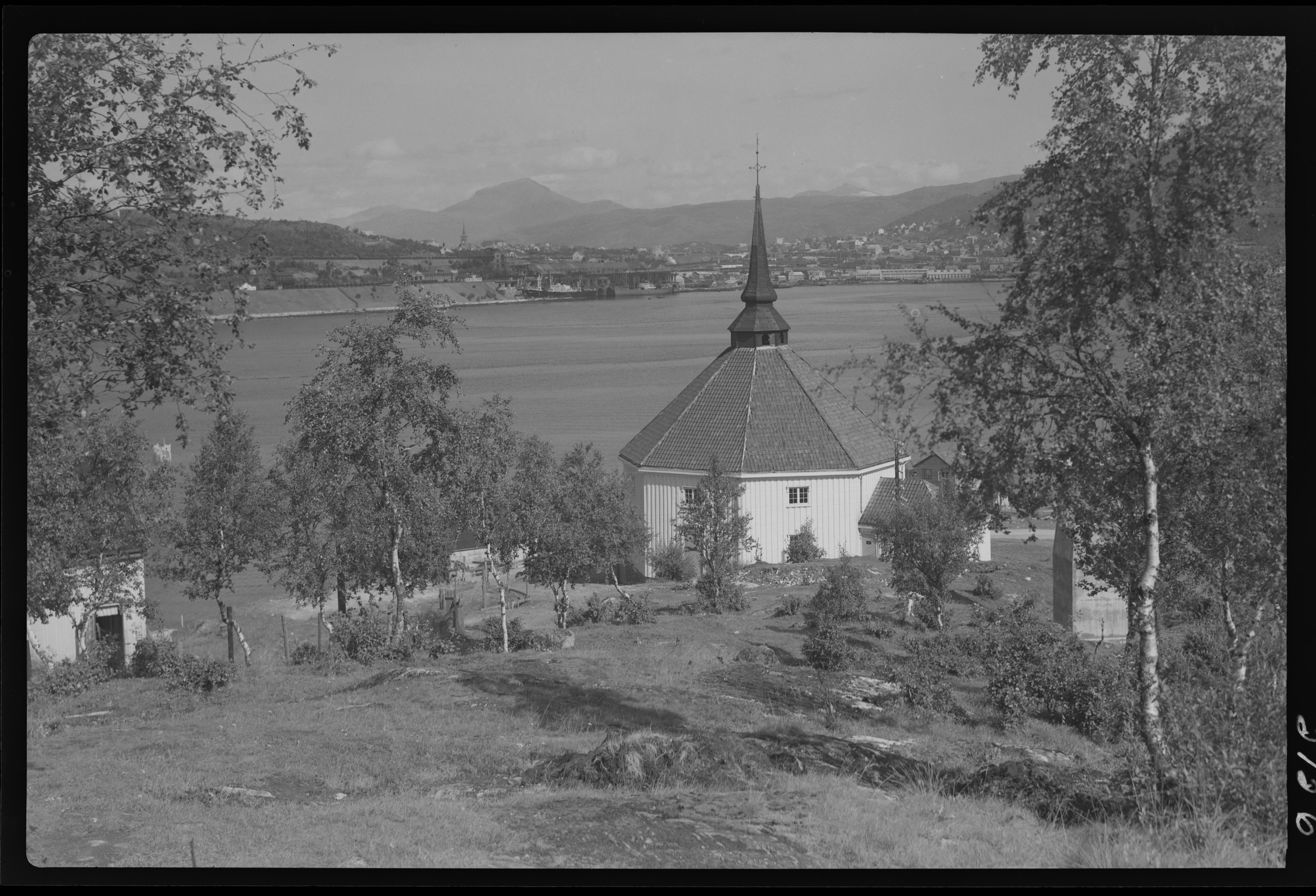

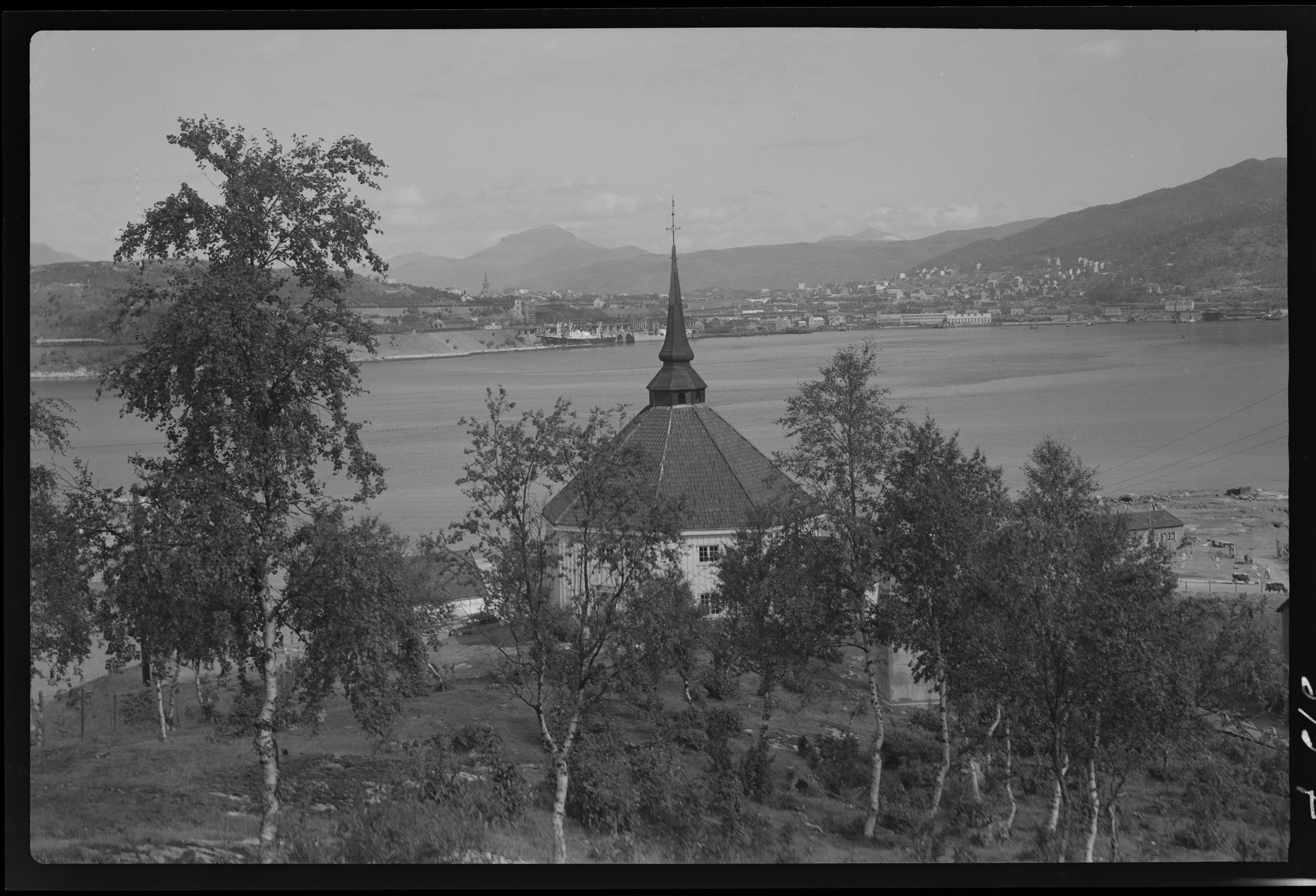

== See also ==
- List of churches in Sør-Hålogaland
- Octagonal churches in Norway
