= Bogen, Evenes =

Village in Evenes Municipality, Norway

Bogen, Evenes: Bogen (Norwegian); Ránda (Northern Sami)
- Village
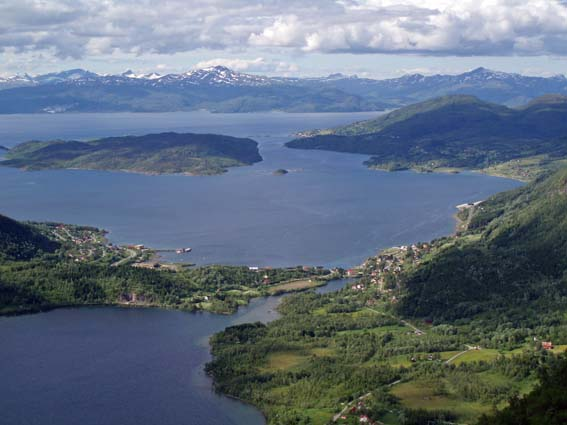
- View of the village (looking south)
- Interactive map of Bogen, Evenes
- Location within Nordland Location within Norway
- Coordinates: 68.5263°N 16.9933°E
- Country: Norway
- Region: Northern Norway
- County: Nordland
- District: Ofoten
- Municipality: Evenes Municipality

Area
  - Total: 0.54 km^{2} (0.21 sq mi)
- Elevation: 10 m (33 ft)

Population (2023)
  - Total: 363
  - Density: 672/km^{2} (1,740/sq mi)
- Time zone: UTC+01:00 (CET)
  - Summer (DST): UTC+02:00 (CEST)
- Post Code: 8533 Bogen i Ofoten

Bogen (Norwegian) or Ránda (Northern Sami) is the administrative centre of Evenes Municipality in Nordland county, Norway. The village is located along the shore of the Ofotfjorden, about 10 kilometres (6.2 mi) northeast of the village of Liland. The European route E10 highway passes through the village. Bogen Chapel is located in this village.

The 0.54-square-kilometre (130-acre) village has a population (2023) of 363 and a population density of 672 inhabitants per square kilometre (1,740/sq mi).

Historically, Bogen is most notable for small-scale iron ore mining in the early 20th century as well as being a German naval base during World War II, including for the German battleship Tirpitz and the heavy cruiser Admiral Hipper.

== Media gallery ==
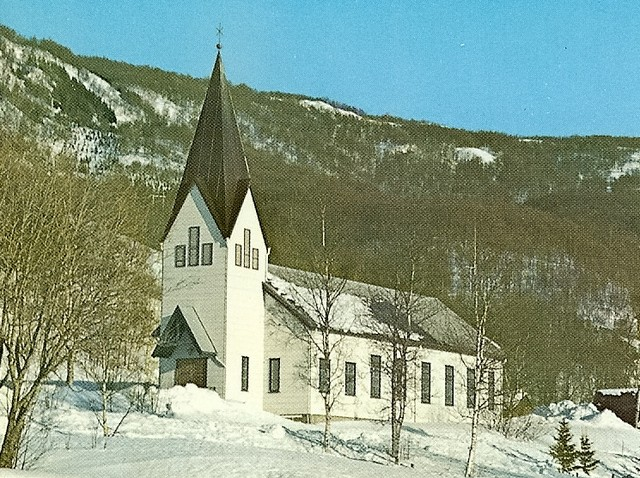
Bogen chapel, March 2008

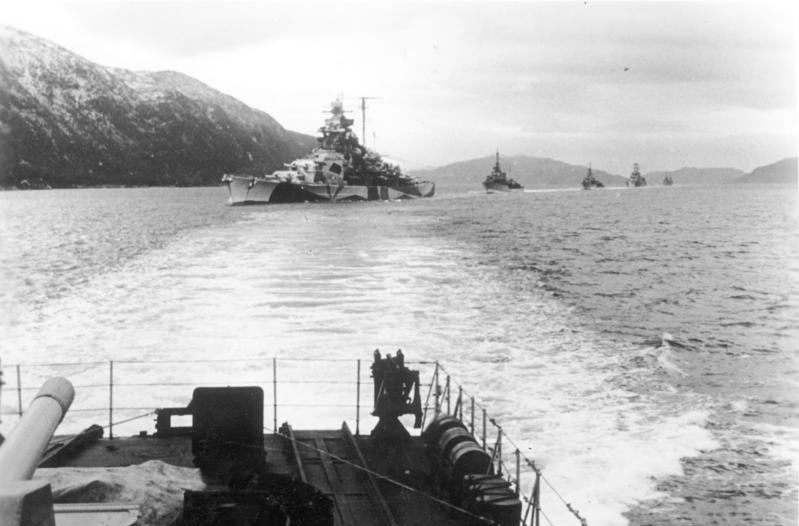
Tirpitz, escorted by several destroyers, steaming in the Bogenfjord in October 1942

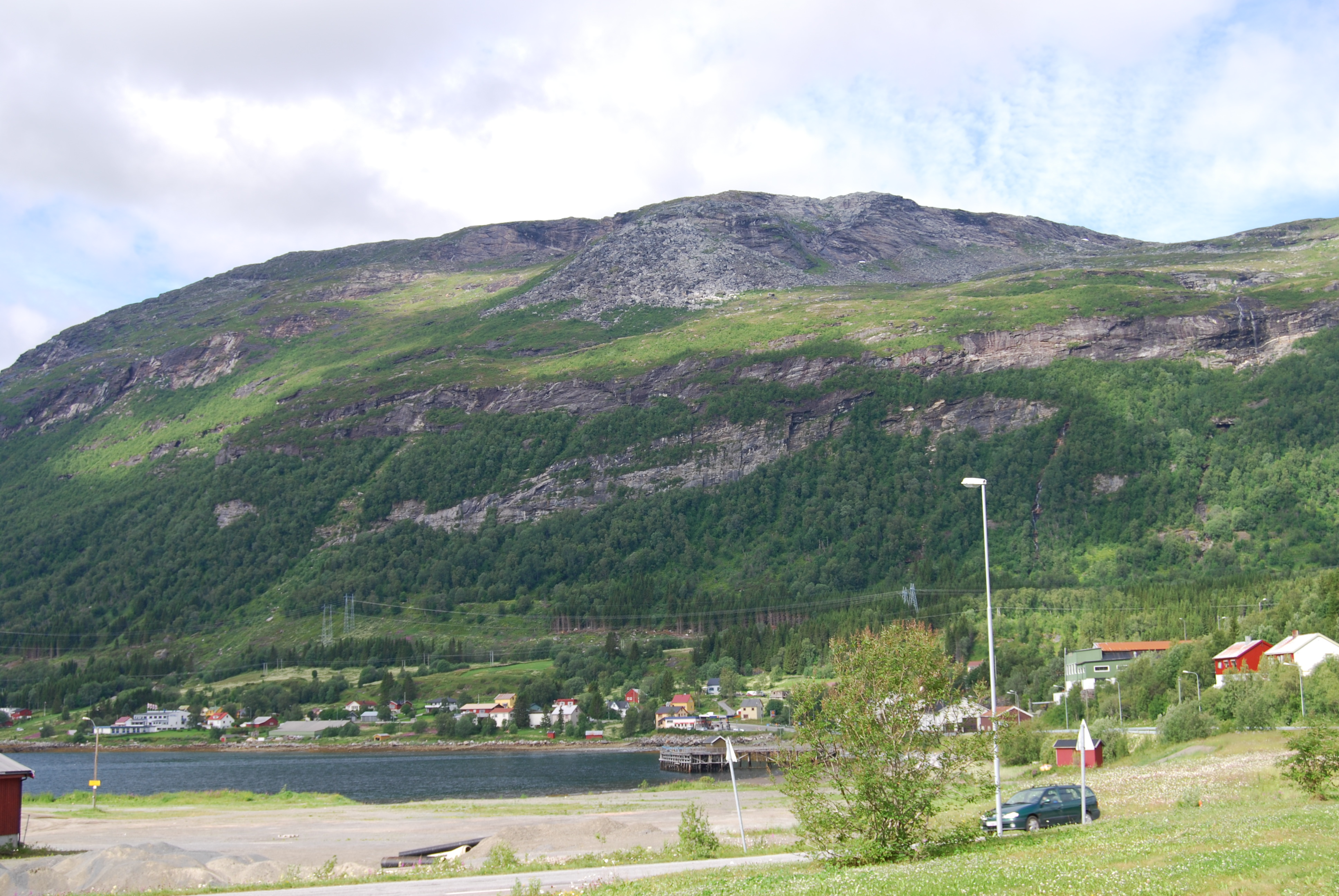

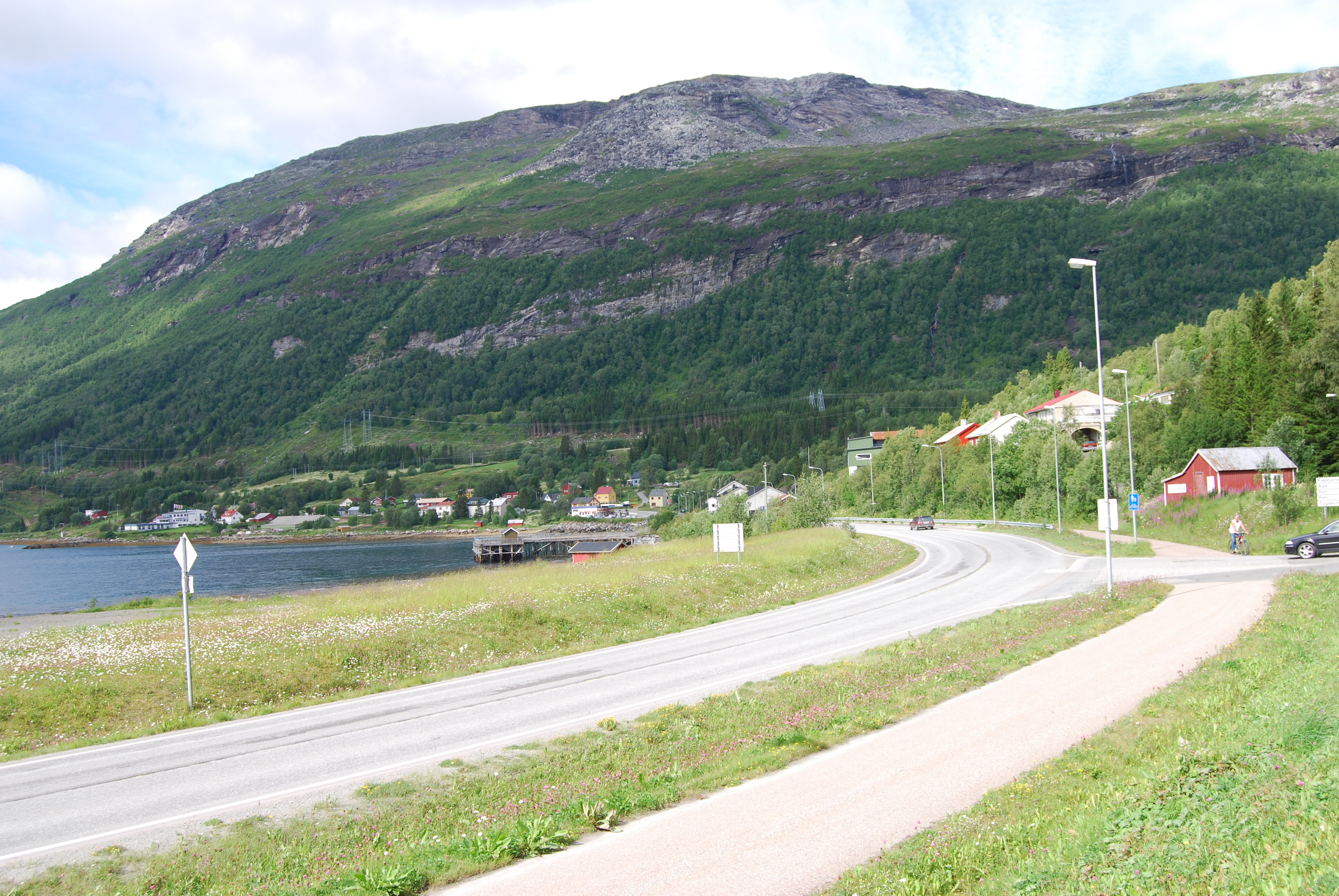
