= Ofoten =

- Traditional district
- The pink area in the map is the Ofoten region council. Lødingen is not part of the council, but is considered a part of the Ofoten district.
- Interactive map of Ofoten
- Coordinates: 68.3083°N 16.0186°E
- Country: Norway
- Region: Northern Norway
- County: Nordland

Area
  - Total: 7,829 km^{2} (3,023 sq mi)

Population (2015)
  - Total: 29,968
  - Density: 3.828/km^{2} (9.914/sq mi)
- Time zone: UTC+01:00 (CET)
  - Summer (DST): UTC+02:00 (CEST)

Ofoten is a traditional district in Nordland county in Northern Norway. It consists of Evenes Municipality, Narvik Municipality, and Lødingen Municipality. It is named after the main fjord, Ofotfjorden, which is at the center of this district. The 7,829-square-kilometre (3,023 sq mi) district was home to 29,968 residents in 2016, with almost half of the residents living in the town of Narvik.

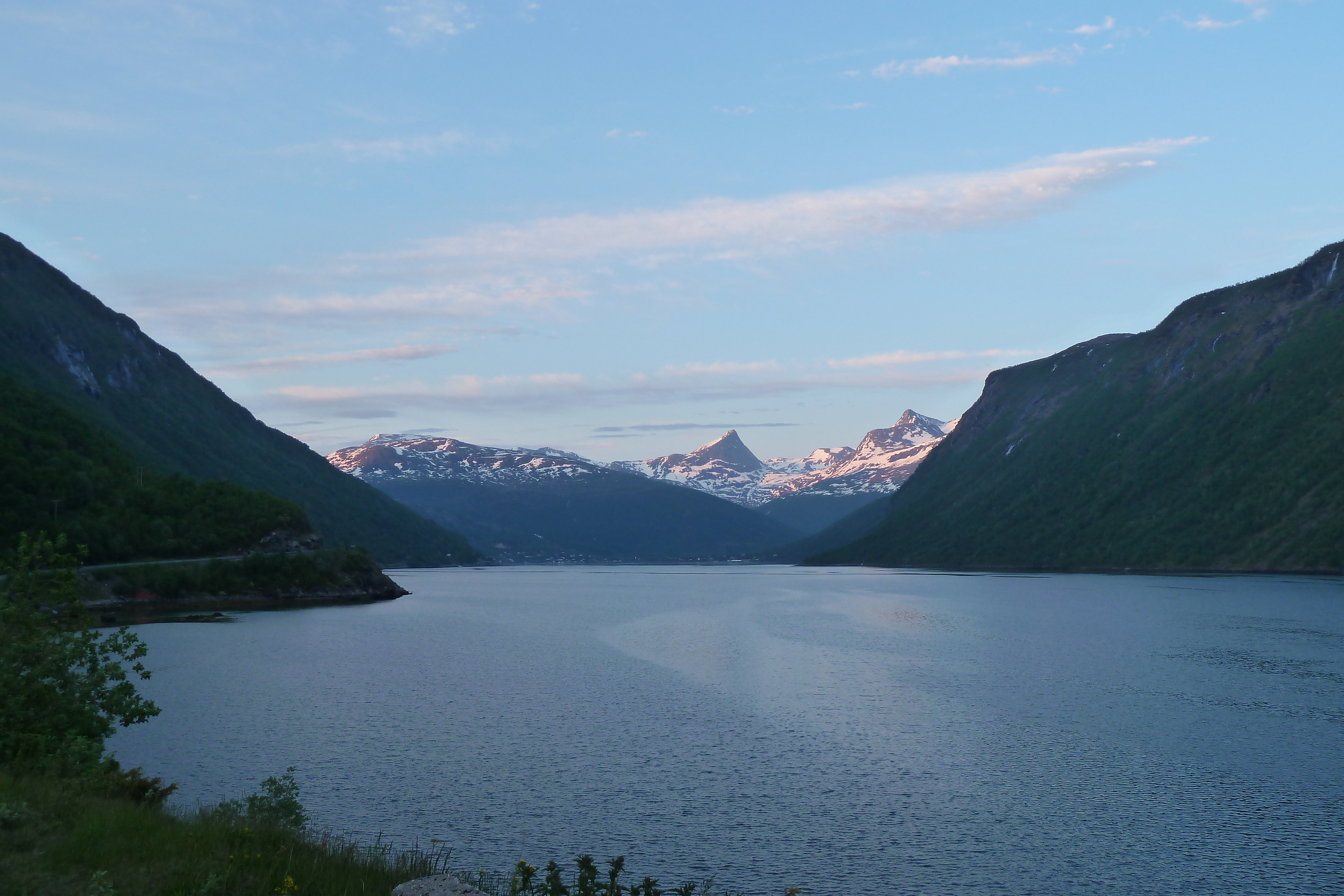
View of Beisfjorden

== Geography ==
Ofoten is characterized by fjords surrounded by many mountains with high, jagged peaks reaching up to 1,900 metres (6,200 ft) in height. About 43% of the area lies above 600 metres (2,000 ft). Below elevations of 500 metres (1,600 ft) there are forests. Only 11% of the land is below an elevation of 60 metres (200 ft). The mountains are high especially in the east. In the interior parts of the municipality, there are a number of glaciers, such as Gihtsejiegŋa, and also many lakes. Besides the Ofotfjorden, there are a number of other fjords that cut into the landscapes, often with steep shorelines.

The traditional district of Lofoten lies to the west of Ofoten, to the south is the traditional district of Salten, to the east is northern Sweden, and to the north is Troms county.

== History ==
The old Ofoten Municipality was established on 1 January 1838 (see formannskapsdistrikt law). On 1 January 1884, the municipality ceased to exist when it was split into two municipalities: Ankenes Municipality (population: 1,734) and Evindnæs Municipality (population: 2,397).

== Name ==
The district is named after Ofotfjorden (Old Norse: Ófóti). The meaning of the first element is unknown and the last element is derived from the Old Norse word fótr which means "foot". The oldest form of the name could have been Úffóti. In this case, the first element is úfr which means "Eurasian eagle-owl". The three inner branches of the Ofotfjord might have been compared with the three claws of an owl.

== Media gallery ==
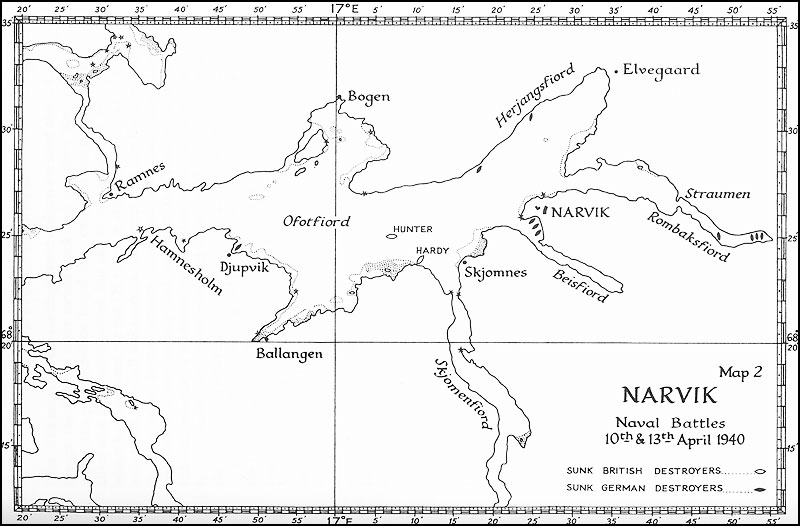

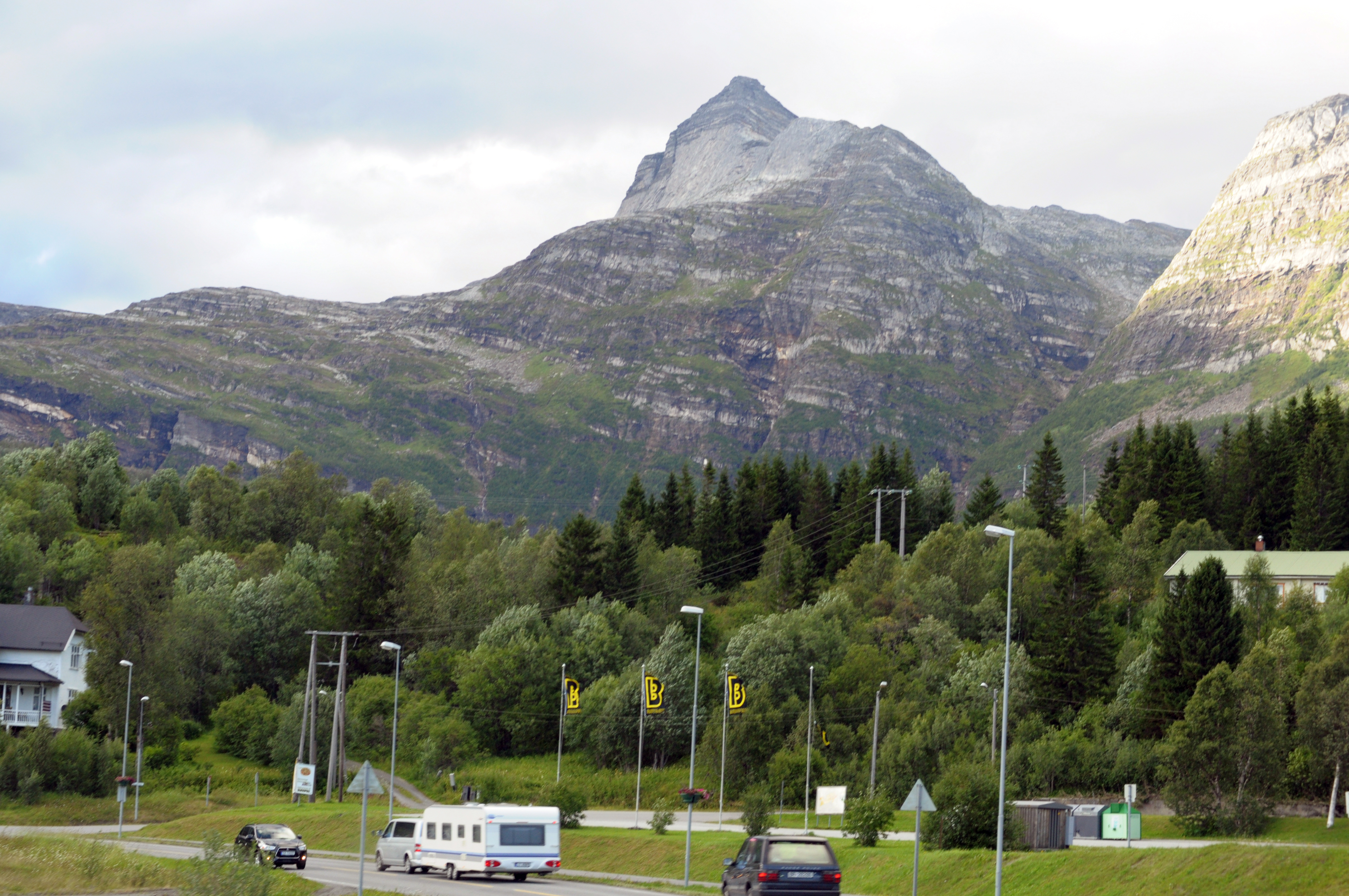
Niingen mountain, Bogen in Evenes

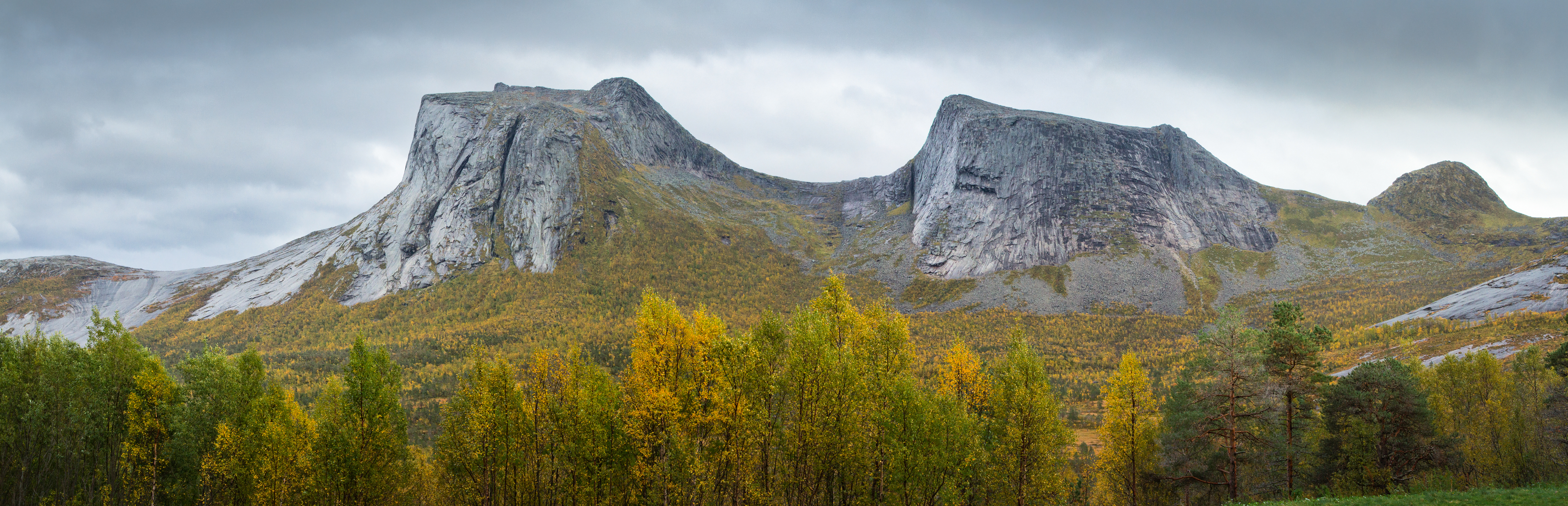
View from Efjorddalen, Narvik

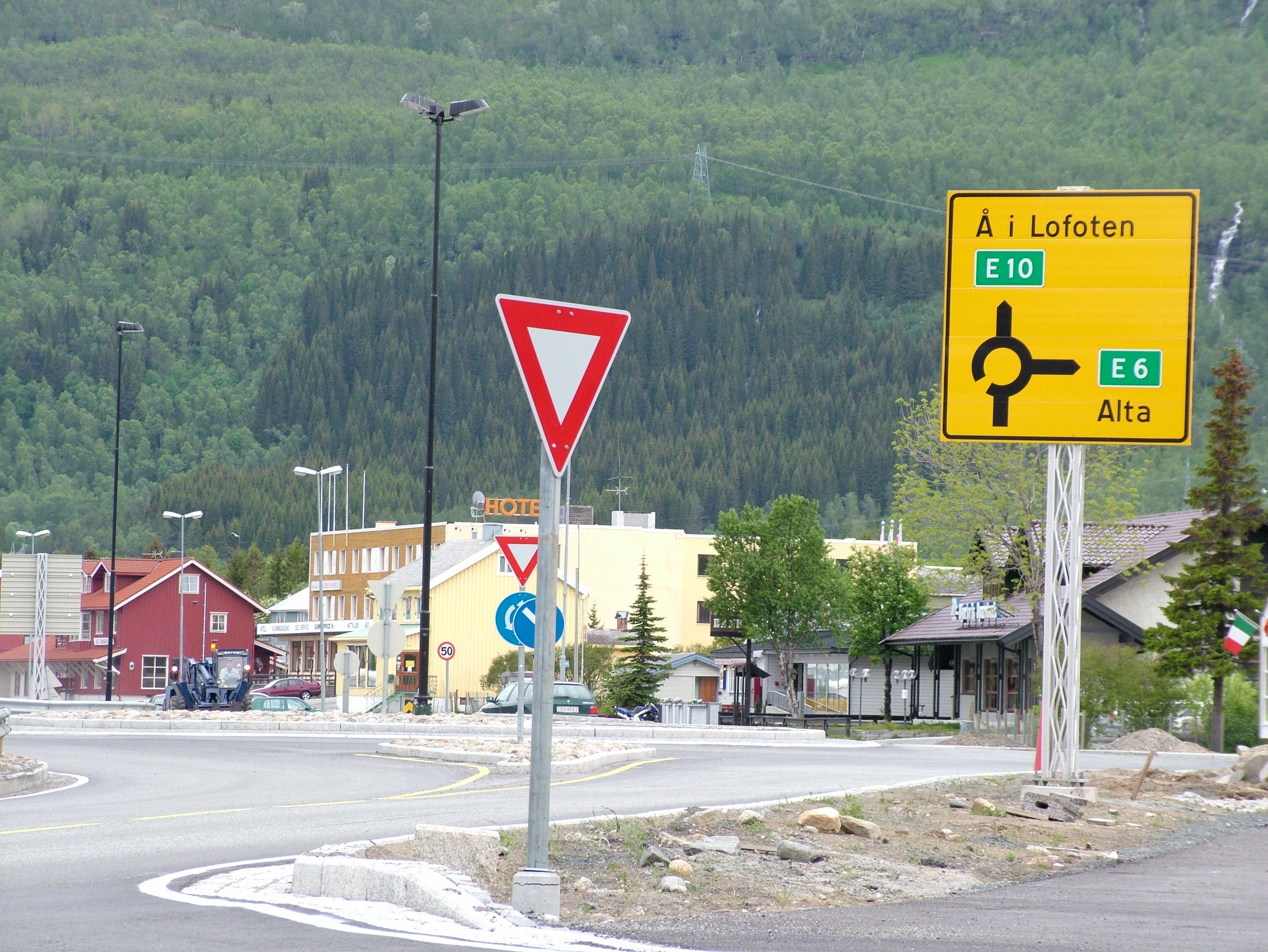
Bjerkvik is an important road junction; E10 goes west to Lofoten and E6 goes north to Troms

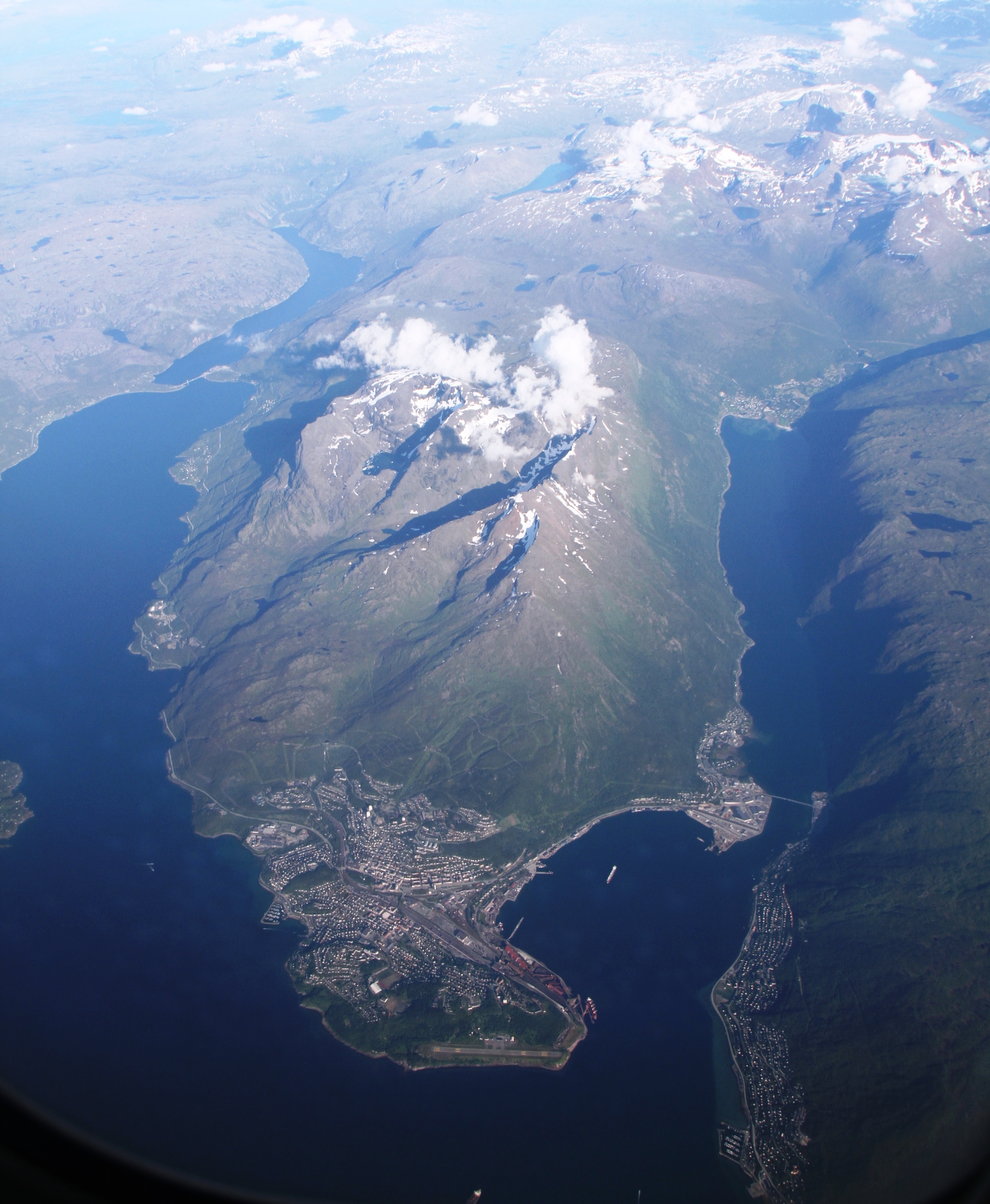
Aerial of Narvik seen from west

== See also ==
- Radio Narvik
