= Ofotfjord =

Fjord in Nordland, Norway

- Narvik Fjord
- Ofotfjorden (Norwegian); Ufuohttá (Northern Sami)
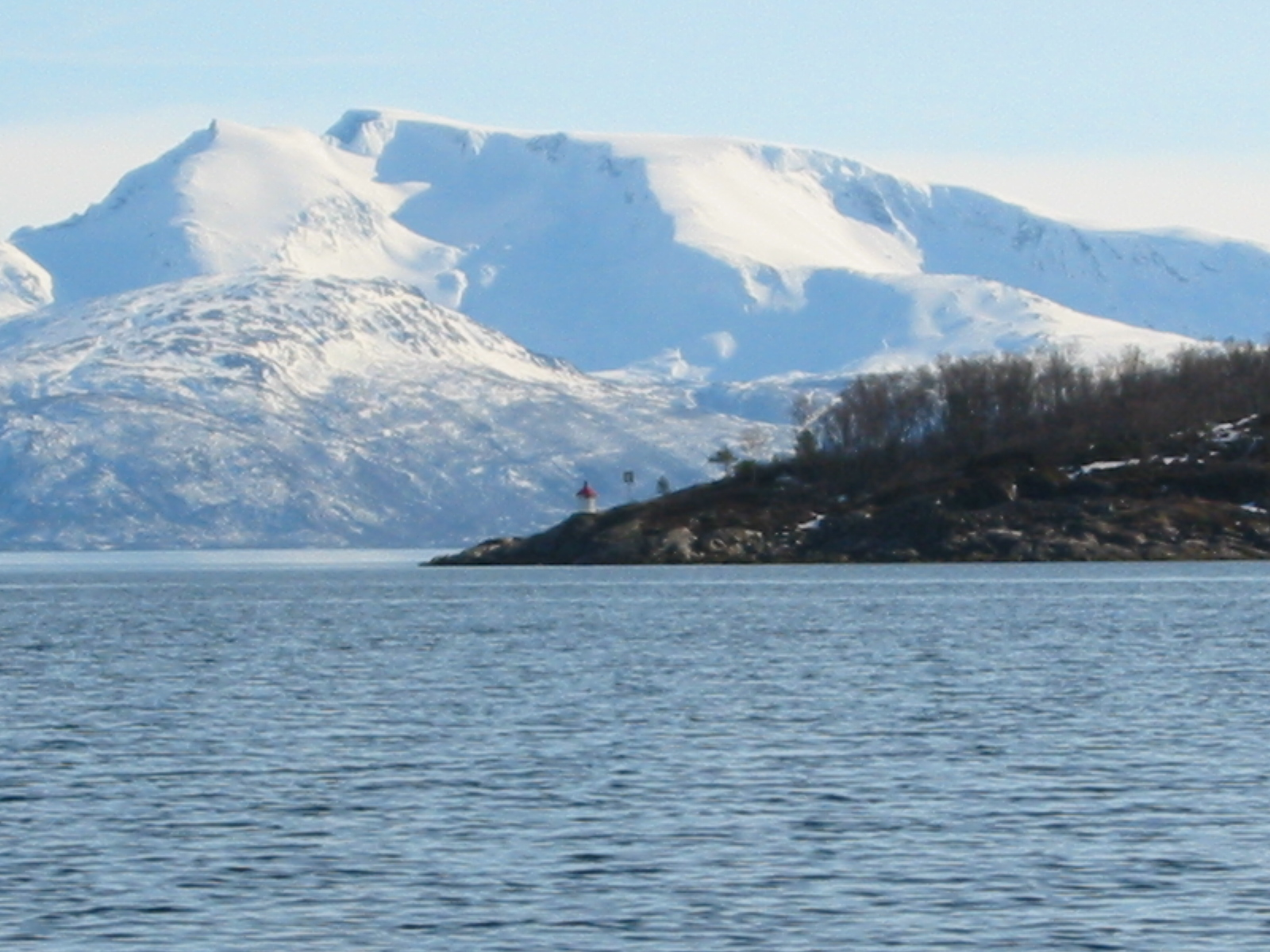
- View of the fjord
- Interactive map of the fjord
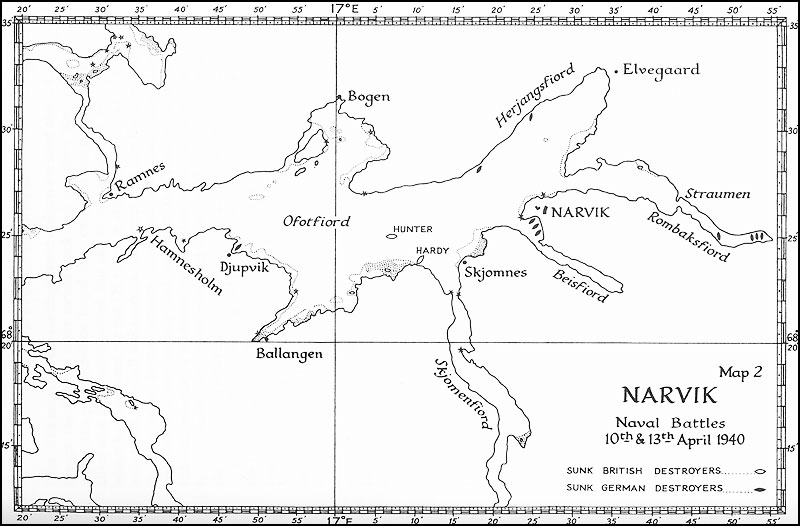
- Diagram of the fjord and locations from the Battle of Narvik
- Location: Nordland county, Norway
- Coordinates: 68.4292°N 16.4827°E
- Type: Fjord
- Basin countries: Norway
- Max. length: 78 kilometres (48 mi)
- Max. depth: 553 metres (1,814 ft)
- Settlements: Narvik

The Ofotfjord (Norwegian: Ofotfjorden; Northern Sami: Ufuohttá) or Narvik Fjord is a fjord in Nordland county, Norway. It is an inlet of the Norwegian Sea, located about 200 kilometres (120 mi) north of the Arctic Circle. The 78-kilometre (48 mi) long Ofotfjord is Norway's 12th longest fjord and it is also the 18th deepest, with a maximum depth of 553 metres (1,814 ft). In the English language and in many historical documents, this fjord is often referred to as the Narvik Fjord because the town of Narvik is located on the inner shores of the fjord, but this is not an official name of the fjord.

The fjord is surrounded by mountains, some reaching 1,500 metres (4,900 ft), and even 1,700 metres (5,600 ft) in Skjomen, where the Frostisen glacier can be seen. The only large lowland area is on parts of the northern shore, around Harstad/Narvik Airport, Evenes, although there are smaller areas near the fjord and in narrow valleys (for instance, the Narvik peninsula, where the harbour and city centre of Narvik is located).

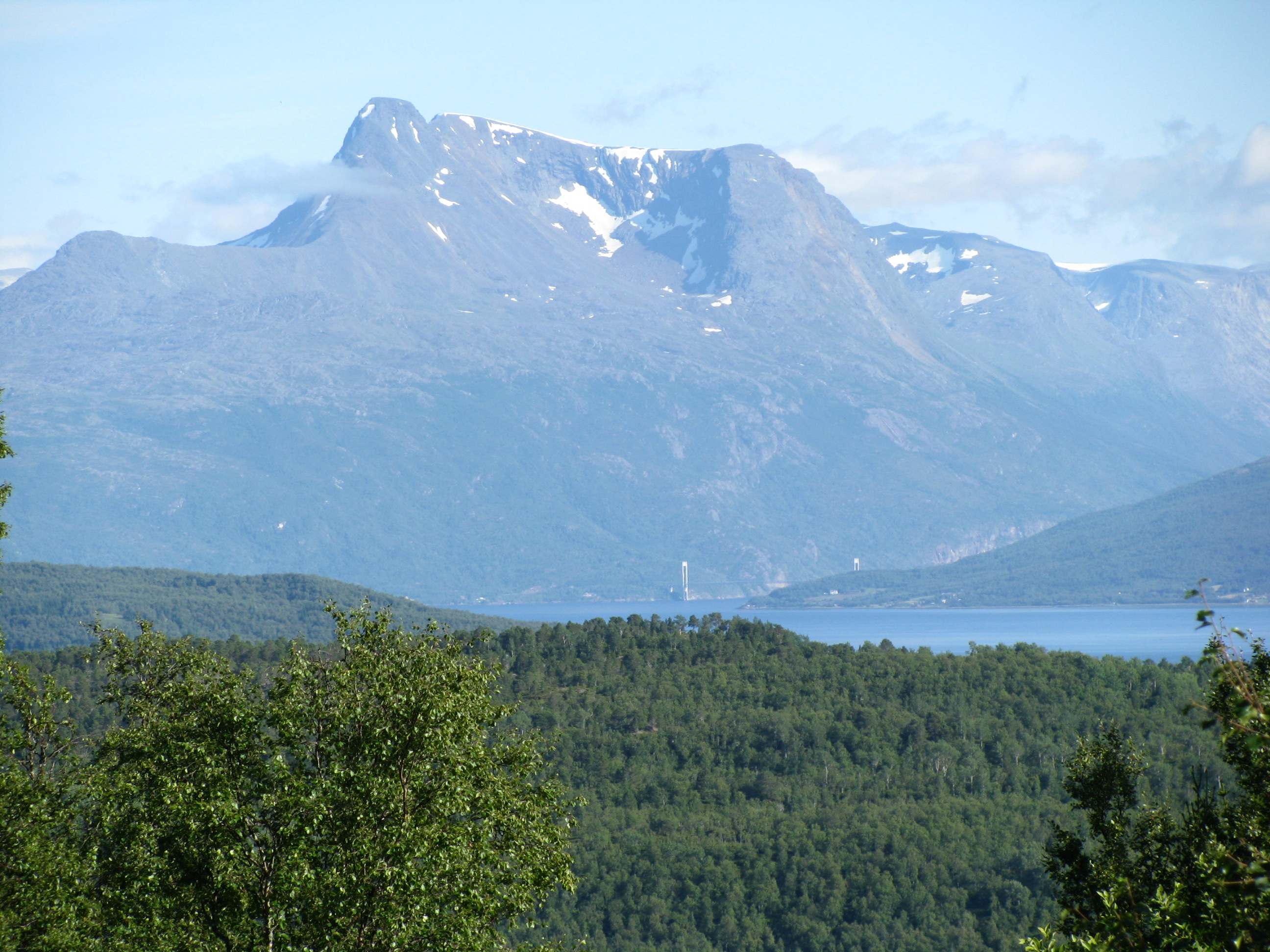
The fjord is surrounded by mountains and forested hills

The mountains are covered by forest below elevations of 500 metres (1,600 ft), birch being the most common tree, but pine and aspen are also common. The bedrock around the fjord consist of both hard minerals like gneiss and granite as well as softer minerals rich in lime; there is a dolomite quarry in the municipality of Narvik Municipality (photo).

== Name ==
The surrounding Ofoten district is named after the Ofotfjord (Old Norse: Ófóti). The meaning of the first element is unknown. One theory is that the oldest form of the fjord name was Úffóti. In this case, the first element would be úfr which means "Eurasian eagle-owl". The last element of the name is the dative case of fótr which means "foot" or "leg (including the foot)". Thus, the name could be referring to leg/foot of an owl, likely because the three inner branches of the Ofotfjord might have been compared with the three claws of an owl.

== Geography ==
The Ofotfjord is the longest fjord in Nordland county and the fourth longest in Northern Norway. Tjeldsund Municipality and Evenes Municipality are located on the northern shore and the large Narvik Municipality is located on the eastern and southern shores of the fjord. Lødingen Municipality (and beyond that all of Lofoten) and the large Vestfjord are located west-south-west of the Ofotfjord.

Several smaller fjord branches extend from the main fjord. From north-west, going clockwise, these are: Ramsundet (which is actually a narrow strait connecting with the larger Tjeldsundet), Bogen (a fairly wide bay), Herjangsfjord (the widest of these branches), Rombaken (which is crossed by the European route E6 highway using the Rombak Bridge), Beisfjorden (crossed by the European route E6 highway using the Beisfjord Bridge), Skjomen (the longest of these fjord branches, crossed by the E6 highway using the Skjomen Bridge) and finally Ballangen. At the mouth of Ofotfjord, on the southern side, is another fjord, the narrow Efjorden, which extends southeast (crossed by the E6 highway using the Efjord Bridges).

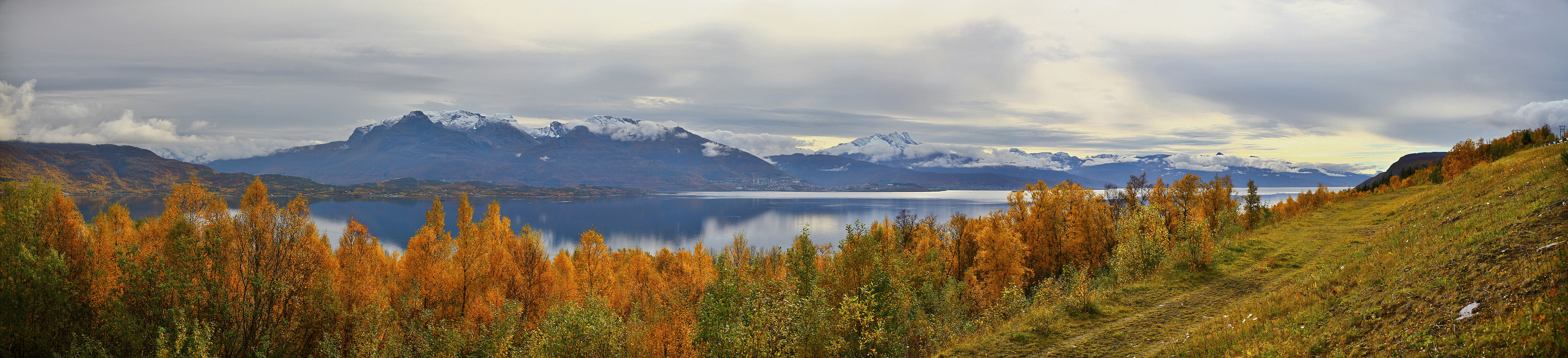
Herjangsfjord in the foreground and Ofotfjord in the background, pictured from the north side.

== Fauna ==
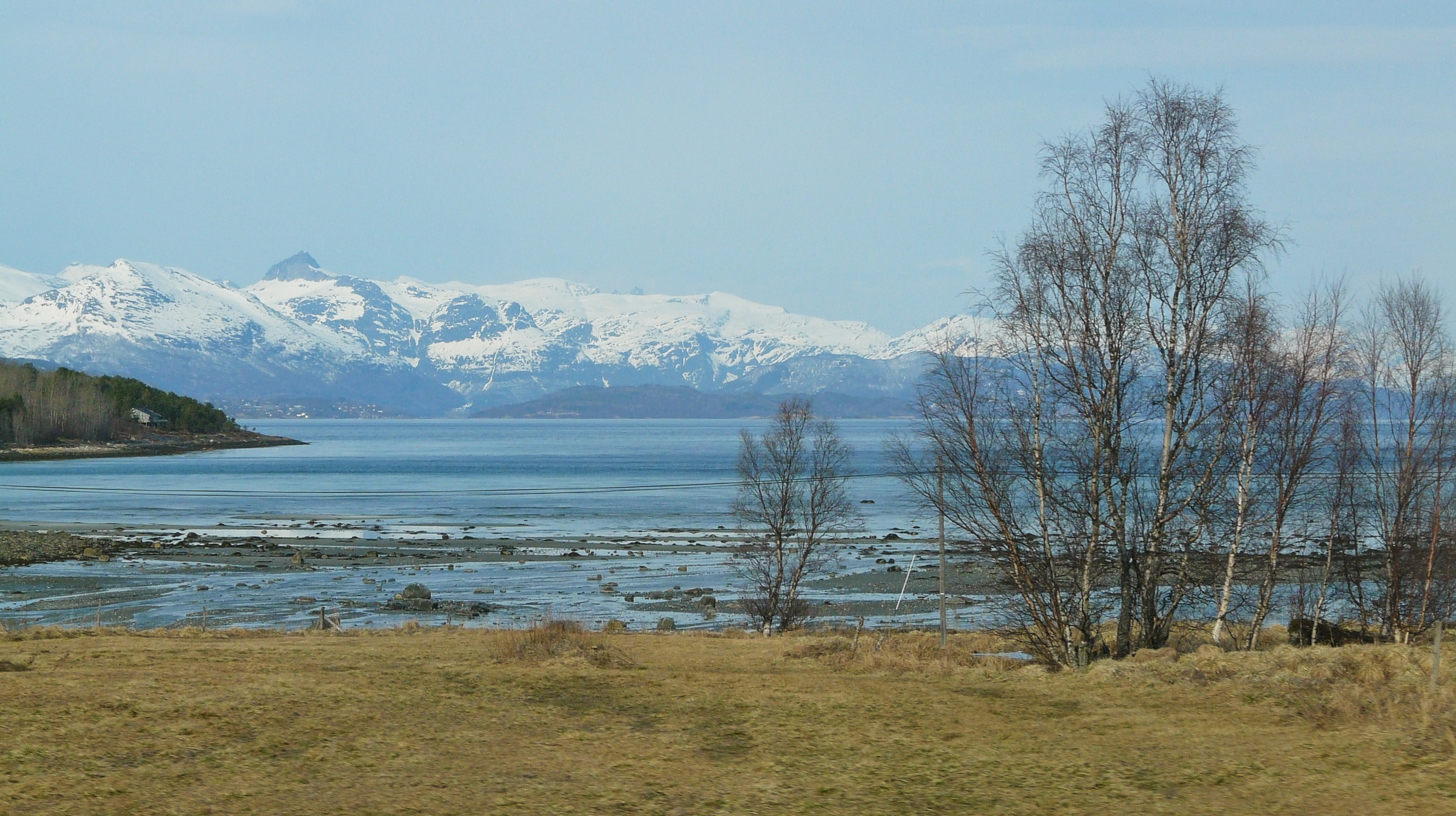
View from Djupvika towards Bogen. 2 May 2009

The Ofotfjord has a rich marine life, with huge quantities of herring staying in the fjord in the winter. These fish attract a lot of whales, most notably orca. Divers have occasionally observed lobsters in the fjord, the northernmost sightings of lobsters in the world. Cod, as well as coalfish, are the most common fish species throughout the year. Mackerel is common from July to mid-September. White-tailed eagles and Eurasian otters have made a strong comeback and are now very common in and around the fjord. Gulls are common all year, and many migratory birds arrive in summer, such as oystercatchers and grey herons.

== History ==
=== Naval battleground ===
In the Battles of Narvik in World War II, the Ofotfjord was the scene for several naval battles, and many ships are resting at the bottom, especially in the vicinity of Narvik harbour. These are very popular among divers. However, some of these shipwrecks are declared war graves and are thus protected by law. The German destroyer Georg Thiele was scuttled and is still visible from around the railway between Straumsnes and Rombak railway station.

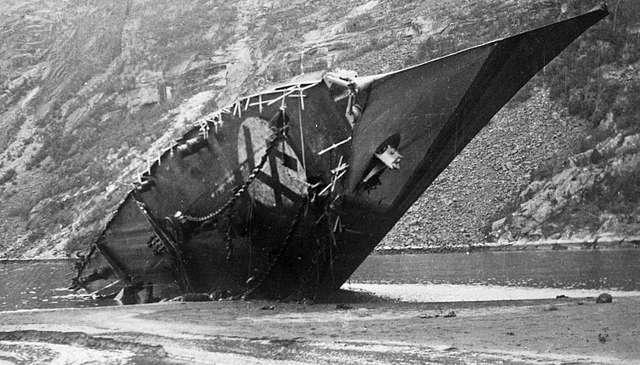
German destroyer Bernd von Arnim scuttled in Rombaksfjord

Tirpitz in Bogen, Ofotfjord. The Kriegsmarine used the Bogen fjord branch as a naval base
