= The Amazing Race 17 =

Season of television series

- Season 17
- Region 1 DVD cover
- Presented by: Phil Keoghan
- No. of teams: 11
- Winners: Natalie "Nat" Strand & Katherine "Kat" Chang
- No. of legs: 12
- Distance traveled: 32,000 mi (51,000 km)
- No. of episodes: 12

Release
- Original network: CBS
- Original release: September 26 – December 12, 2010

Additional information
- Filming dates: May 26 – June 15, 2010

Series chronology
- ← Previous; Season 16 Next → Season 18

The Amazing Race 17 is the seventeenth season of the American reality competition show The Amazing Race. Hosted by Phil Keoghan, it featured eleven teams of two, each with a pre-existing relationship, competing in a race around the world to win US$1,000,000. This season visited four continents and ten countries and traveled over 32,000 miles (51,000 km) during twelve legs. Starting in Gloucester, Massachusetts, racers traveled through England, Ghana, Sweden, Norway, Russia, Oman, Bangladesh, Hong Kong, and South Korea before returning to the United States and finishing in Greater Los Angeles. New elements introduced in this season include the Express Pass, which was awarded to the winners of the first leg and allowed them to skip the task of their choosing, and the Double U-Turn. The season premiered on CBS on September 26, 2010, with a special 90-minute premiere, and concluded on December 12, 2010.

Anesthesiologists Natalie Strand and Katherine Chang were the winners of this season, becoming the first all-female team to win The Amazing Race. Home shopping hosts Brook Roberts and Claire Champlin finished in second place while dating couple Jill Haney and Thomas Wolfard finished in third place.

== Production ==
=== Development and filming ===
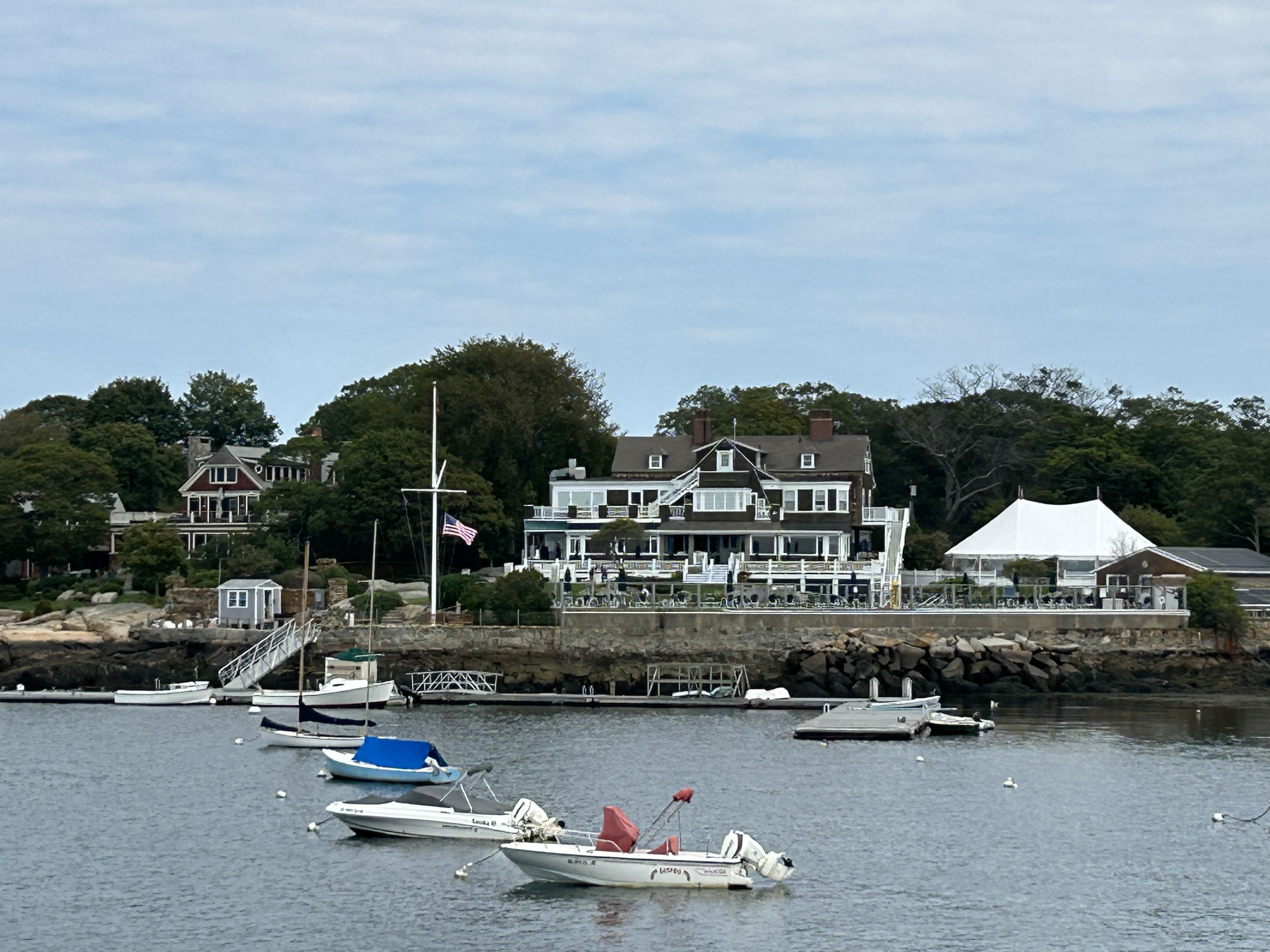
The starting line was at the Eastern Point Yacht Club within the seaport of Gloucester, Massachusetts.

CBS renewed the 17th season of The Amazing Race on January 25, 2010. The season spanned 32,000 miles (51,000 km) while racing across four continents with first-time visits to Ghana and Bangladesh. Teams also crossed the Arctic Circle for the first time in the show's history.

Filming began on May 26, 2010, with the starting line at the Eastern Point Yacht Club in Gloucester, Massachusetts, and finished on June 15, 2010, in Los Angeles, California.

Prior to the season's broadcast, CBS posted a short preview video clip from an episode on the Internet, showing Brook & Claire competing at a watermelon launching challenge using an elastic slingshot. The clip showed Claire being hit in the face full-on with a watermelon after it failed to launch correctly from the slingshot, leaving her momentarily stunned but otherwise not seriously injured. The clip spread virally on the Internet.

Two new game elements were introduced in season 17. The first was the Express Pass, which was awarded to the team who finished first on the first Leg. The Express Pass allowed the team to skip any one task before Leg 8. The other new element was the Double U-Turn, where two teams were able to use U-Turns in a single leg.

== Contestants ==
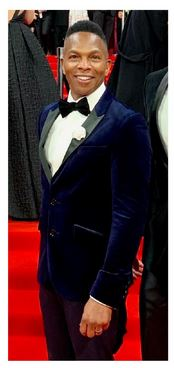
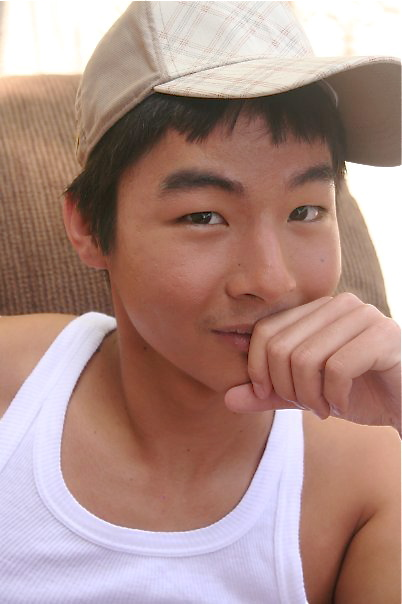
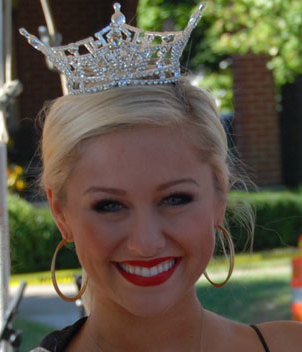
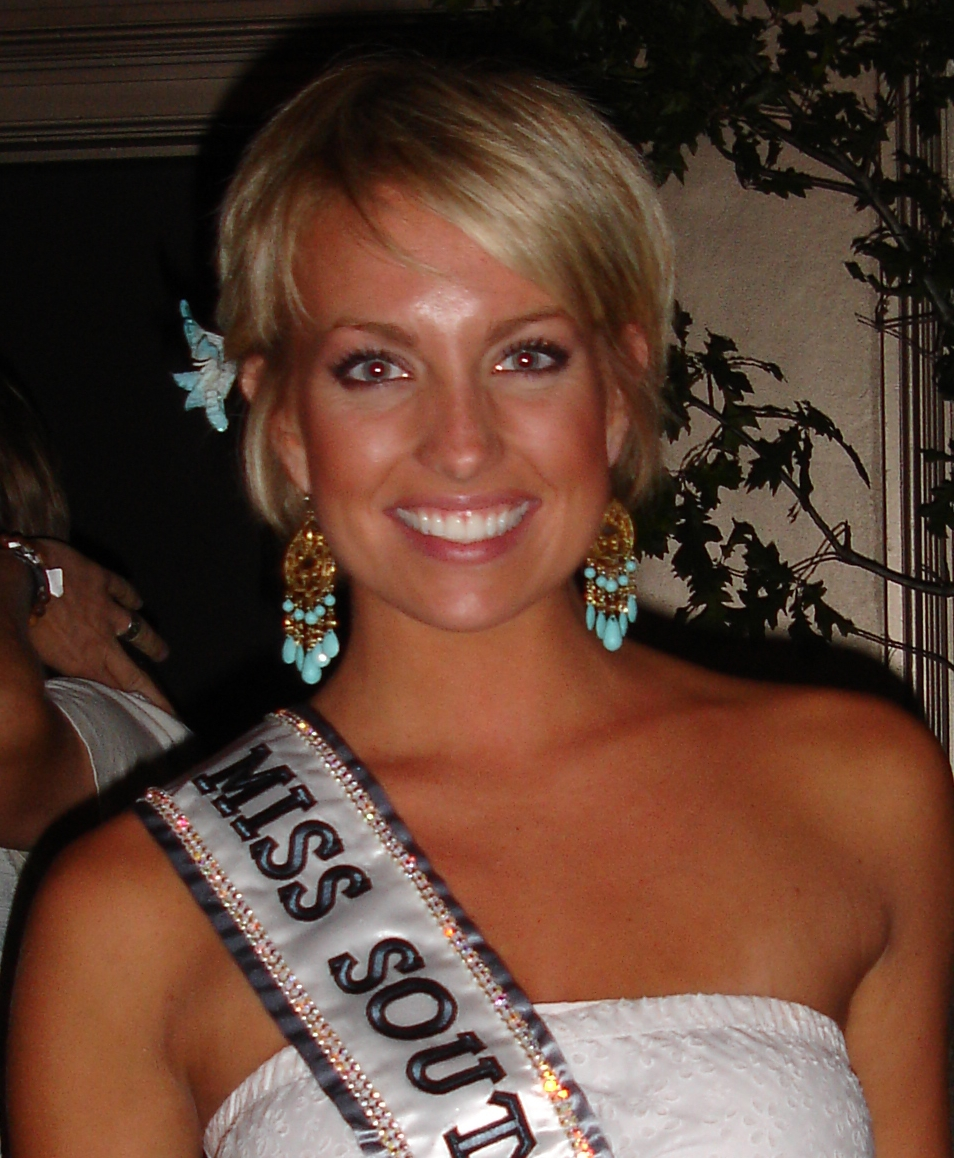
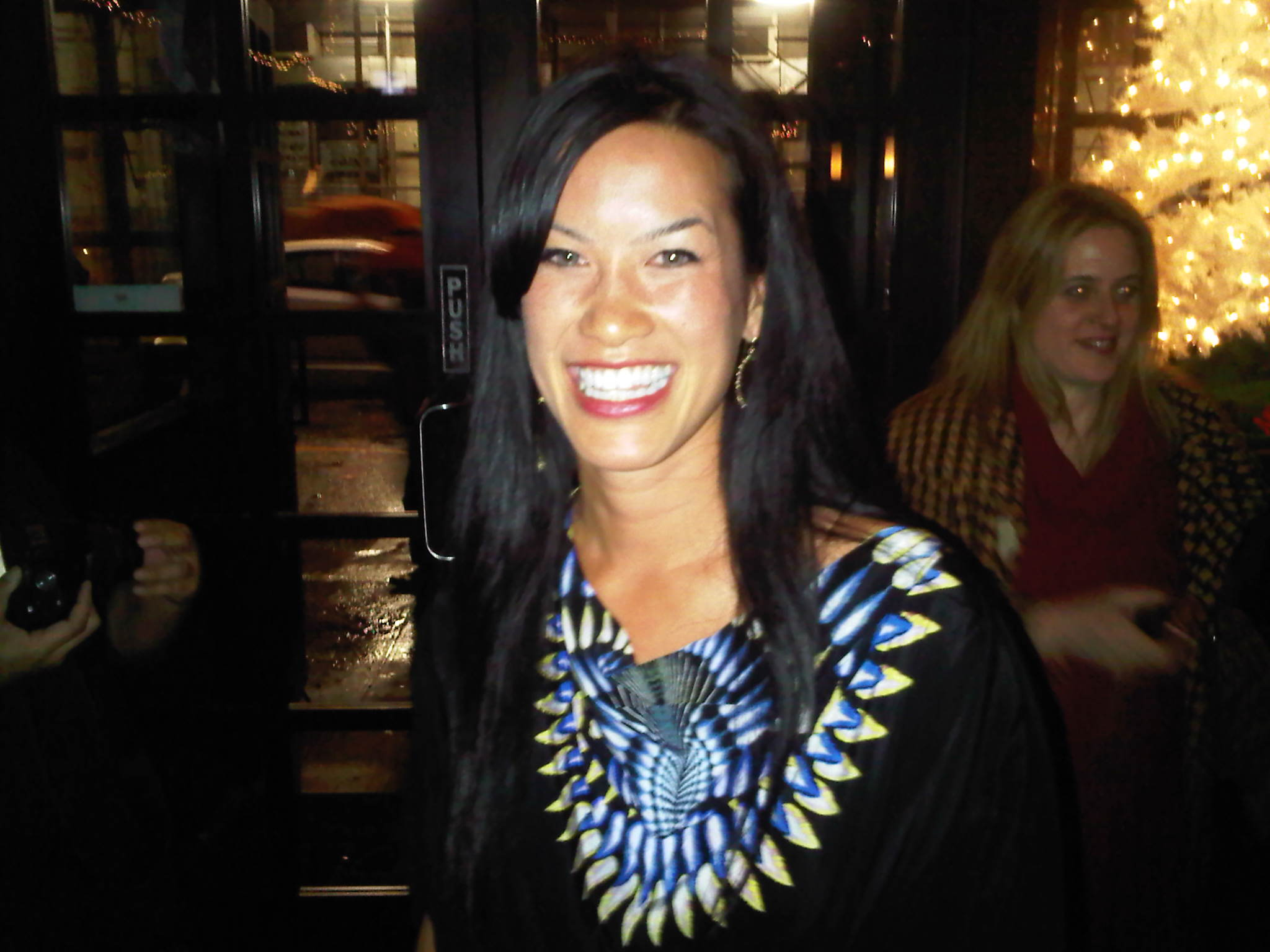
From left to right: Ron Kellum, Kevin Wu, Mallory Ervin, Stephanie Smith, and Kat Chang

The cast included a team of home shopping hosts; Internet entertainer Kevin Wu (popularly known as "KevJumba") and his father, Michael; Cirque du Soleil director and choreographer Ron Kellum; Ivy League a cappella singers, and a birth mother and daughter who recently reunited following an adoption twenty years earlier. There were also three beauty queens competing: Mallory Ervin, who competed in Miss America 2010; Brook Roberts, who competed in Miss America 2005; and Stephanie Smith, who was Miss South Carolina USA 2009.

Chad Waltrip proposed to Stephanie Smith during the eighth leg, and she accepted. They got married on November 20, 2010.

Contestants	Age	Relationship	Hometown	Status
Ron Kellum	45	Best Friends	Los Angeles, California	Eliminated 1st (in Ledbury, England)
Tony Stovall	42	Best Friends	Tucson, Arizona	Eliminated 1st (in Ledbury, England)
Andie DeKroon	43	Birth Mom & Daughter	Atlanta, Georgia	Eliminated 2nd (in Accra, Ghana)
Jenna Sykes	21	Birth Mom & Daughter	Atlanta, Georgia	Eliminated 2nd (in Accra, Ghana)
Connor Diemand-Yauman	22	Ivy League A Cappella Singers	Chesterland, Ohio	Eliminated 3rd (in Riksgränsen, Sweden)
Jonathan Schwartz	22	Ivy League A Cappella Singers	Cranford, New Jersey	Eliminated 3rd (in Riksgränsen, Sweden)
Katie Seamon	23	Beach Volleyball Partners	Rahway, New Jersey	Eliminated 4th (in Ankenesstranda, Norway)
Rachel Johnston	24	Beach Volleyball Partners	Moorestown, New Jersey	Eliminated 4th (in Ankenesstranda, Norway)
Michael Wu	58	Father & Son	Sugar Land, Texas	Eliminated 5th (in Saint Petersburg, Russia)
Kevin Wu	20	Father & Son	Sugar Land, Texas	Eliminated 5th (in Saint Petersburg, Russia)
Gary Ervin	53	Father & Daughter	Morganfield, Kentucky	Eliminated 6th (in Muscat, Oman)
Mallory Ervin	24	Father & Daughter	Lexington, Kentucky	Eliminated 6th (in Muscat, Oman)
Chad Waltrip	26	Newly Dating (Legs 1-8); Engaged (Legs 8-9)	Fort Lauderdale, Florida	Eliminated 7th (in Dhaka, Bangladesh)
Stephanie Smith	23	Newly Dating (Legs 1-8); Engaged (Legs 8-9)	Fort Lauderdale, Florida	Eliminated 7th (in Dhaka, Bangladesh)
Nick DeCarlo	26	Dating	Henderson, Nevada	Eliminated 8th (in Seoul, South Korea)
Vicki Casciola	26	Dating	Henderson, Nevada	Eliminated 8th (in Seoul, South Korea)
Jill Haney	27	Dating	Marina Del Rey, California	Third place
Thomas Wolfard	30	Dating	Marina Del Rey, California	Third place
Brook Roberts	27	Home Shopping Hosts	San Diego, California	Runners-up
Claire Champlin	30	Home Shopping Hosts	Reno, Nevada	Runners-up
Nat Strand	31	Doctors	Newport Beach, California	Winners
Kat Chang	35	Doctors	Santa Monica, California	Winners

Future appearances

Gary & Mallory raced again in The Amazing Race: Unfinished Business. Mallory also returned on the second All-Star edition, racing with Mark Jackson from season 20 as a last-minute replacement when his original partner, Bopper Minton, was deemed too sick to compete. Brook and Claire appeared on The Amazing Race: 25 Years Around the World.

Outside of The Amazing Race, Mallory appeared on the Discovery Channel reality show Backyard Oil in 2013. On May 25, 2016, Nat & Kat and Brook & Claire appeared on an Amazing Race-themed primetime special of The Price Is Right.

== Results ==
The following teams are listed with their placements in each leg. Placements are listed in finishing order.

- A red placement with a dagger (†) indicates that the team was eliminated.
- An underlined blue placement with a double-dagger (‡) indicates that the team was the last to arrive at a Pit Stop in a non-elimination leg, and had to perform a Speed Bump task in the following leg.
- A green ƒ indicates that the team won the Fast Forward.
- A purple ε indicates that the team used an Express Pass on that leg to bypass one of their tasks.
- A brown ⊃ indicates that the team used the U-Turn and a brown ⊂ indicates the team on the receiving end of the U-Turn.

Team placement (by leg)
Team	1	2	3	4	5	6	7	8	9	10	11	12
Nat & Kat	2nd	7th	8th	1st	1stƒ (Note: This team won the Fast Forward on this leg.)	4th	1st	5th	3rd⊃ (Note: Nat & Kat chose to use the U-Turn on Chad & Stephanie.)	1st	3rd	1st
Brook & Claire	4th	1st	6th	3rd	5th	2nd	2nd	4th	4th⊂ (Note: Jill & Thomas chose to use the U-Turn on Brook & Claire.)	3rd	2nd (Note: Brook & Claire initially arrived 1st, but were issued a 30-minute penalty for taking a taxi to the Detour when the clue had instructed teams to travel either on foot or by subway. Jill & Thomas checked in during this penalty time, dropping Brook & Claire to 2nd.)	2nd
Jill & Thomas	1st	5th	7th	5thε (Note: Jill & Thomas used their Express Pass to bypass the Detour on this leg.)	3rd	1st	5th	2nd (Note: Jill & Thomas initially arrived 1st, but were issued a 30-minute penalty for paying a taxi driver to lead them to the Pit Stop, which had been expressly prohibited. Chad & Stephanie checked in during this penalty time, dropping Jill & Thomas to 2nd.)	1st⊃	2nd	1st	3rd
Nick & Vicki	10th	8th	5th	6th	6th	7th‡ (Note: While Nick & Vicki came in last in a non-elimination leg, they did not have to complete a Speed Bump in the following leg due to technical difficulties on this leg.)	3rd	3rd	2nd	4th‡	4th†	
Chad & Stephanie	8th	4th	3rd	7th	7th	5th	6th (Note: Chad & Stephanie arrived at the Pit Stop without their bags and without having paid their taxi driver. They were required to return to their taxi, pay their fare, and retrieve their bags before being allowed to check in. During this time, Michael & Kevin arrived in 6th, but were issued two 30-minute penalties for twice hiring a taxi when it had been expressly prohibited. Chad & Stephanie returned during Michael & Kevin's penalty time, but were issued a 30-minute penalty for also taking a taxi when the clue instructed them to travel on foot. At that point, they were the only two teams left to check in, and since Michael & Kevin had more than 30 minutes remaining on their penalty time, Chad & Stephanie finished in 6th place, while Michael & Kevin fell to last and were eliminated.)	1st	5th†⊂			
Gary & Mallory	6th	9th	2nd	2nd	2nd	6th	4th	6th†				
Michael & Kevin	7th	3rd	9th‡	4th	4th	3rd	7th†					
Katie & Rachel	5th	2nd	4th	8th	8th†							
Connor & Jonathan	3rd	6th	1st	9th†								
Andie & Jenna	9th	10th†										
Ron & Tony	11th†											

== Race summary ==
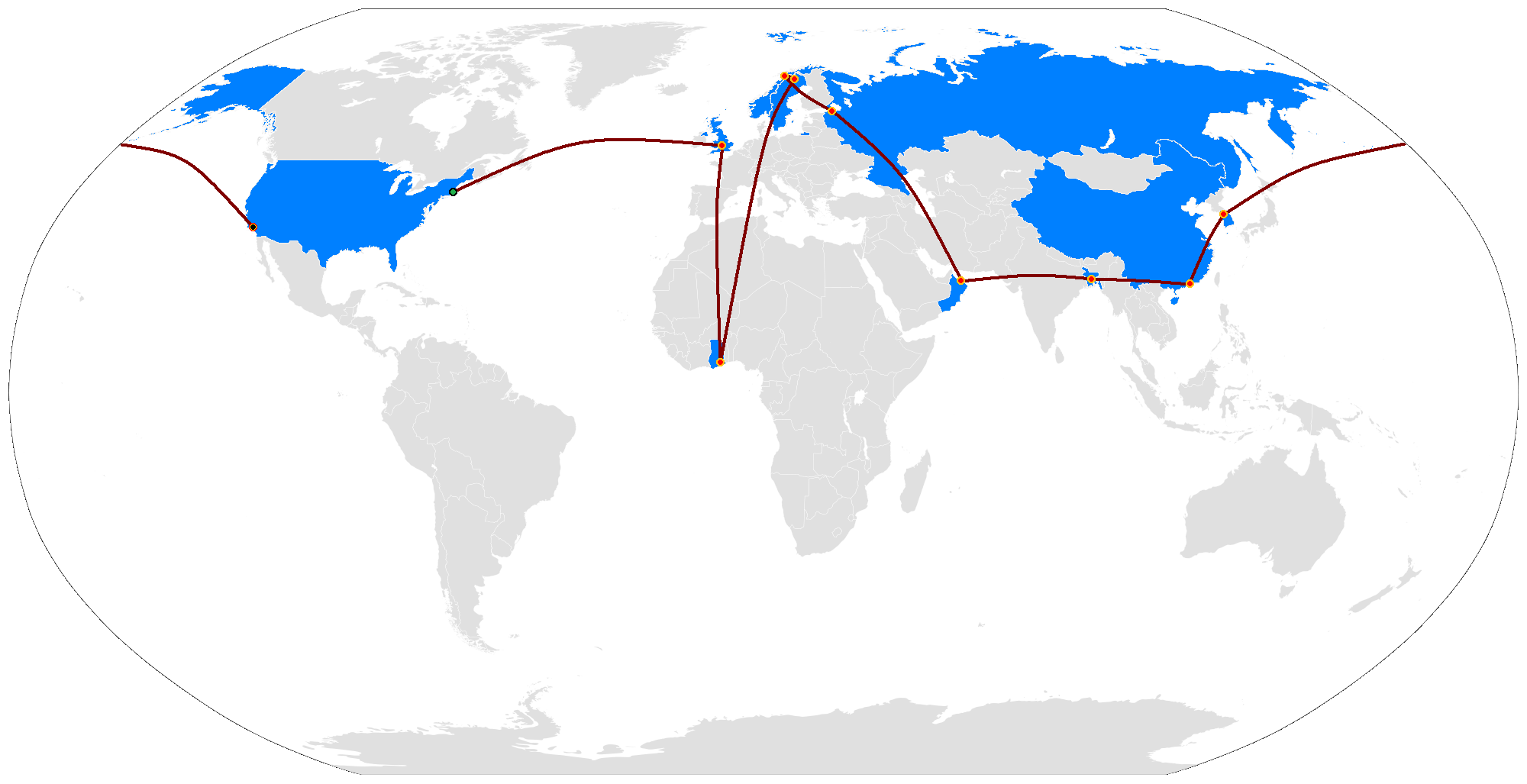
The route of The Amazing Race 17.

Destinations	Air travel Rail travel Water travel Bus travel Helicopter travel Bicycle travel Gondola travel
Route Markers	Detour Roadblock Fast Forward U-Turn Speed Bump Pit Stop

=== Leg 1 (United States → England) ===
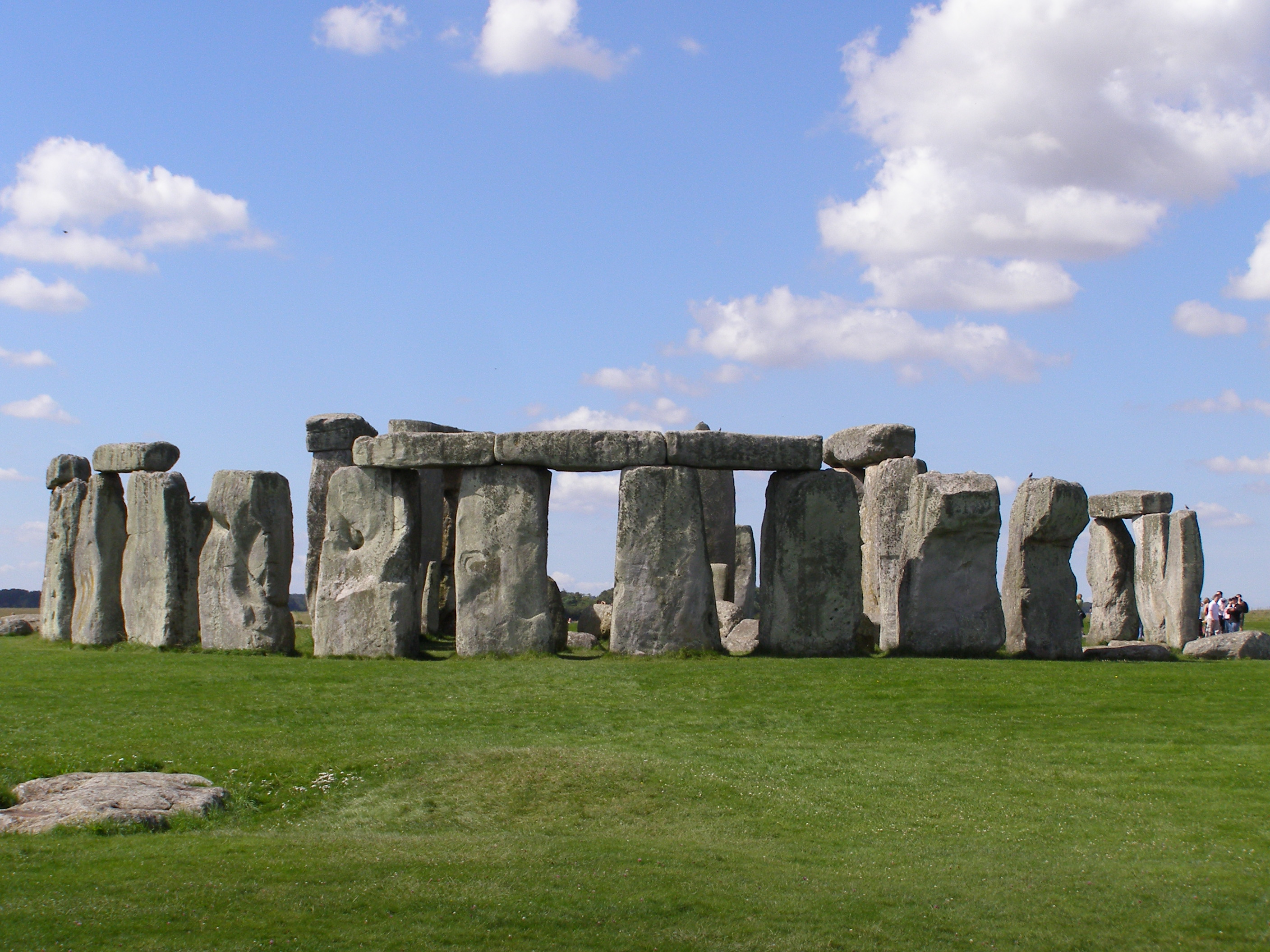
The prehistoric monument of Stonehenge in England served as the first destination of The Amazing Race 17.

- Episode 1: "They Don't Call It The Amazing Race For Nothin!" (September 26, 2010)
- Prize: Express Pass (awarded to Jill & Thomas)
- Eliminated: Ron & Tony

Locations

- Gloucester, Massachusetts (Eastern Point Yacht Club) (Starting Line)
- Boston → London, England
- Amesbury (Stonehenge)
- Ledbury (Eastnor Castle)

Episode summary

- Teams set off from the Eastern Point Yacht Club in Gloucester, Massachusetts, and drove to Logan International Airport, where they had to book one of two flights to London, England. The first three teams were booked on one flight, while the other teams were booked on a second flight that departed a half-hour later. Once in London, teams had to drive to Stonehenge in order to find their clue, which was a riddle: "Find the castle that is the opposite of Nor'easter". They had to figure out that their next destination was Eastnor Castle.
- At Eastnor Castle, teams had to climb a ladder on an exterior wall while peasants atop the wall taunted them and poured dirty water on them. Once teams scaled the wall, they had to retrieve a medieval flag, use a coracle to cross the castle's moat, and bring the flag to a knight, who gave them their next clue.
- In this season's first Roadblock, one team member had to travel on horseback to a tournament area. There, they had to use a giant slingshot to launch a watermelon and knock over a suit of armor standing 50 feet (15 m) away in order to receive their next clue, which directed them to search the nearby castle grounds for the Pit Stop.

Additional notes

- While performing the Roadblock, Claire's slingshot became twisted and launched the watermelon back at her, where it smacked her in the face. CBS released a clip of this scene before the season premiere and it became a viral phenomenon. Claire was stunned, but not otherwise seriously injured.
- Ron & Tony were unable to perform the coracle task. Already in last place, production informed them to swim across the moat without applying a penalty. Ron then performed the Roadblock, which was unaired.

=== Leg 2 (England → Ghana) ===
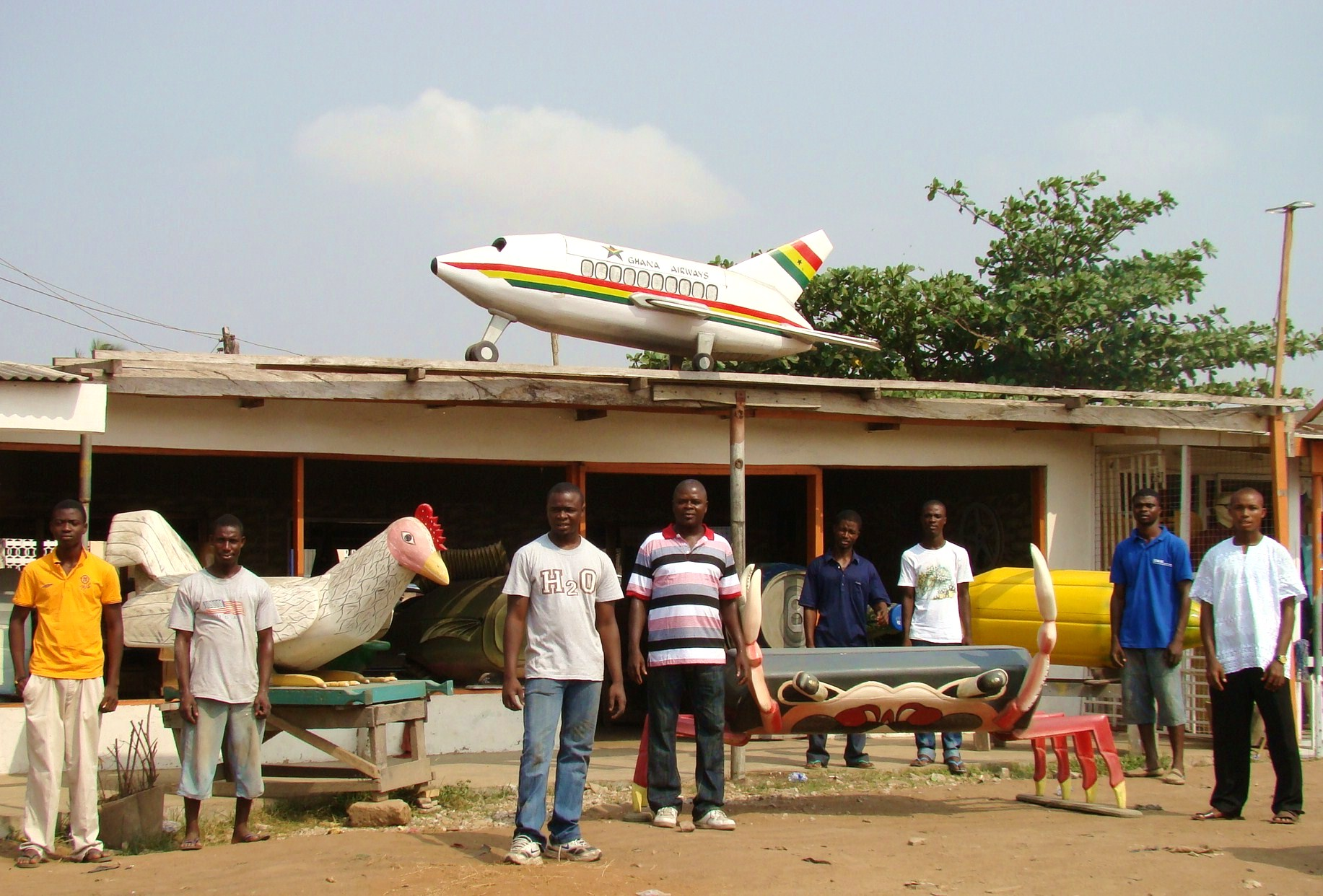
One of the Detour tasks showed the Ga custom of having coffins designed after the decedent's job in life.

- Episode 2: "A Kiss Saves the Day" (October 3, 2010)
- Prize: A trip to Oahu & Kauai (awarded to Brook & Claire)
- Eliminated: Andie & Jenna

Locations

- Ledbury (Eastnor Castle)
- London → Accra, Ghana
- Accra (Kwame Nkrumah Memorial Park)
- Accra (Makola Market)
- Teshie (Peace Motor Spare Parts)
- Teshie (Adom Electronics or Emmanuel's Woodshop & Hello Coffin Showroom)
- Accra (Kaneshie Market)

Episode summary

- At the start of this leg, teams were instructed to fly to Accra, Ghana. Once there, teams had to travel to the Kwame Nkrumah Memorial Park and find their next clue, which directed them to the Makola Market.
- In this leg's Roadblock, one team member had to sell enough sunglasses to make GH₵15 (roughly $10) in order to receive their next clue.
- After the Roadblock, teams had to travel to Peace Motor Spare Parts in Teshie and find their next clue.
- This season's first Detour was a choice between Tune In or Check Out. In Tune In, teams had to travel to Adom Electronics, pick up a television antenna, bring it to a specified house, and set it up to the customer's preference. Once the television picked up a proper signal, the homeowner gave teams their next clue. In Check Out, teams had to bring a fantasy coffin from Emmanuel's Woodshop to a showroom across town in order to receive their next clue.
- After the Detour, teams had to check in at the Pit Stop: Kaneshie Market.

=== Leg 3 (Ghana) ===
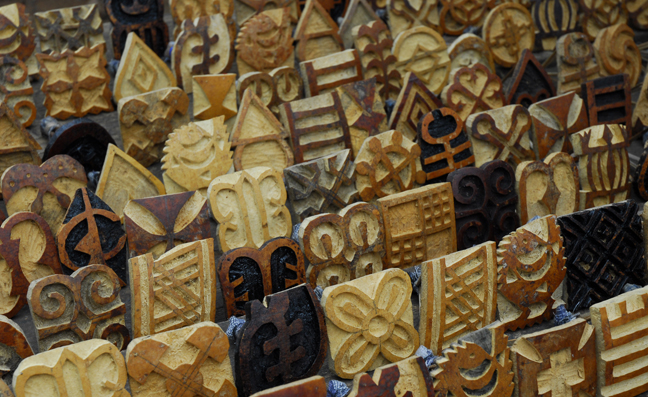
In the Language Arts Detour, teams had to find eight adinkra symbols in a massive puzzle akin to a word search.

- Episode 3: "In Phil We Trust" (October 10, 2010)
- Prize: US$5,000 for each team member (awarded to Connor & Jonathan)

Locations

- Accra (Kaneshie Market)
- Accra (Jamestown – Akotoku Boxing Academy)
- Dodowa (Supply Depot)
- Dodowa (Asebi D/A Primary School)
- Doryumu (Home of Awusa Ntso)

Episode summary

- At the start of this leg, teams had to travel to the Akotoku Boxing Academy in Jamestown, where they found their next clue.
- In this leg's Roadblock, one team member had to perform a boxing workout. After wrapping their hands properly, they had to punch a punching bag and then jump rope for 60 seconds on each exercise without stopping in order to receive their next clue from their boxing trainer.
- After the Roadblock, teams had to travel to the supply depot in Dodowa, where they had to load up two wheelbarrows with building supplies and then deliver them to the Asebi D/A Primary School. Once there, teams had to join a geography class studying a map of Africa. While the children located other nations in Africa, teams had to correctly locate Ghana on the map in order to receive their next clue.
- This leg's Detour was a choice between Bicycle Parts or Language Arts. In Bicycle Parts, both team members had to use a stick to roll a bicycle wheel's rim down the length of a soccer field and back without touching the rim with their hands or letting it fall over in order to receive their next clue. In Language Arts, teams chose a proverb with eight highlighted phrases that corresponded to a series of eight Adinkra symbols. Using a nearby decoder key, teams had to locate the eight symbols in a massive word search-like puzzle and circle the correct set of Adinkra symbols in order to receive their next clue.
- After the Detour, teams had to check in at the Pit Stop: the home of Awusa Ntso in Doryumu. After checking in, teams helped renovate the school that they visited during this leg.

Additional note

- This was a non-elimination leg.

=== Leg 4 (Ghana → Sweden) ===
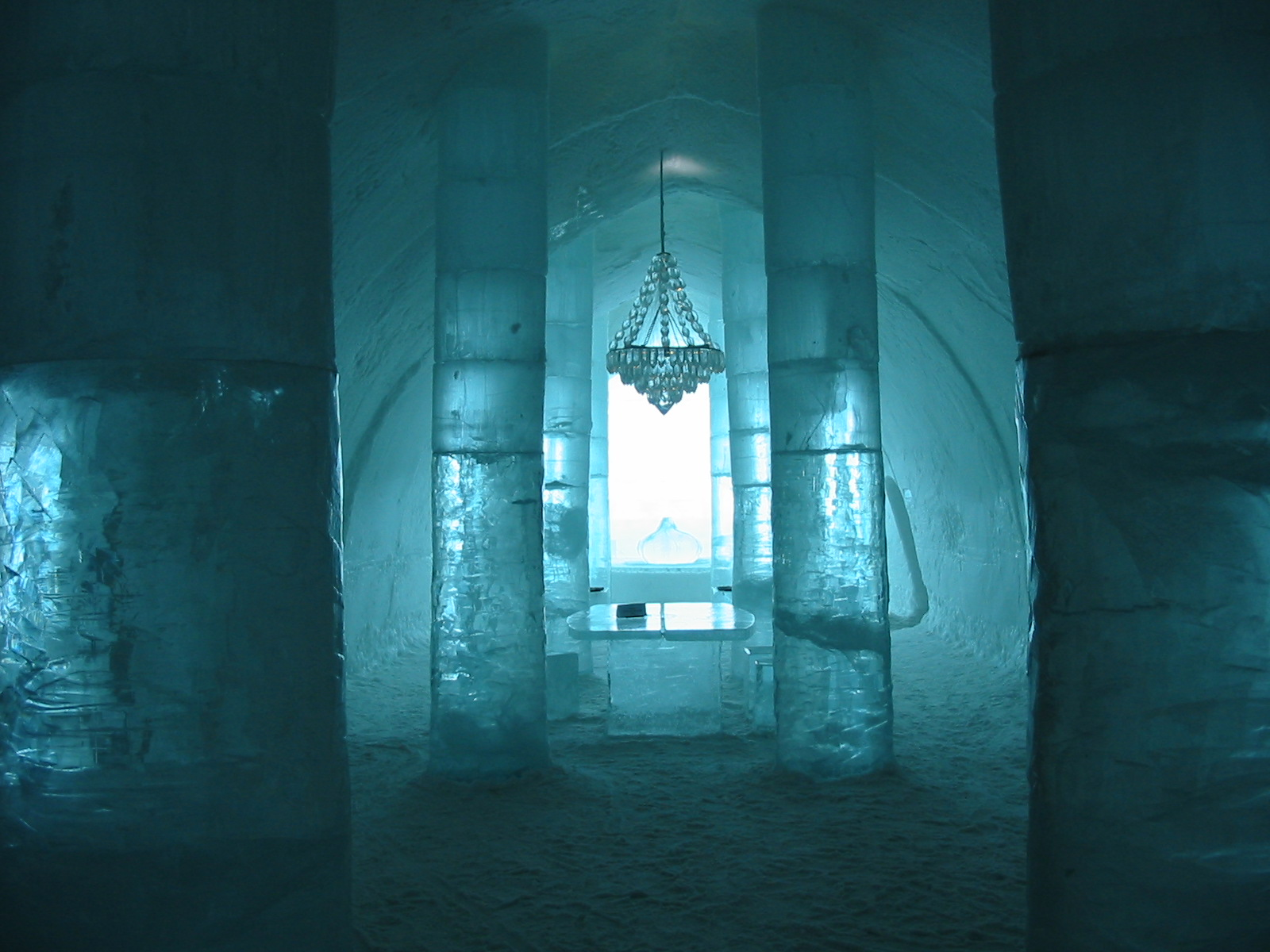
Teams traveled to the Icehotel in Swedish Lapland, north of the Arctic Circle, where Michael & Kevin sat on ice chairs for their Speed Bump.

- Episode 4: "We Should Have Brought Gloves and Butt Pads" (October 17, 2010)
- Prize: A trip to Belize (awarded to Nat & Kat)
- Eliminated: Connor & Jonathan

Locations

- Doryumu (Home of Awusa Ntso)
- Accra → Kiruna, Sweden
- Jukkasjärvi (Icehotel)
- Poikkijärvi (Fjellborg's Lodge)
- Riksgränsen (Vassijaure Railway Station)
- Riksgränsen (Riksgränsen Ski Resort)
- Riksgränsen (Swedish–Norwegian Border)

Episode summary

- At the start of this leg, teams were instructed to fly to Kiruna, Sweden. Once there, teams had drive to the Icehotel in Jukkasjärvi, where they had to pick up a block of ice from the storage room. Teams then had to figure out that their next location was etched on their block of ice: Pietaras Järvivägen Fjellborgs Vid Väkkäräjärvi (Fjellborg's Lodge in Poikkijärvi).
- For their Speed Bump, Michael & Kevin had to sit on chairs made of ice in the Icehotel for ten minutes before they could continue racing.
- In this leg's Roadblock, one team member had to choose a sled dog team and hitch them to a summer training sled. They then had to take the dogs on a course to a hunter's camp, collect five different flags along the way, trade the flags for fur pelts, and then bring the pelts back to the lodge in order to receive their next clue.
- After the Roadblock, teams had to drive to the Vassijaure Railway Station in Riksgränsen, where they found their next clue.
- This leg's Detour was a choice between Sleds or Beds. In Sleds, teams had to use TechSleds to race down a mountain course in less than 1 minute and 58 seconds in order to receive their next clue. In Beds, teams had to properly build a traditional Sami dwelling known as a goahti and furnish the inside with furs and a fire pit in order to receive their next clue. Jill & Thomas used their Express Pass to bypass this Detour.
- After the Detour, teams had to check in at the Pit Stop: the Swedish–Norwegian Border in Riksgränsen.

Additional note

- Due to limited availability of flights from Accra, teams were given tickets on a flight to Kiruna via Frankfurt, Germany, but they were under no obligation to use them.

=== Leg 5 (Sweden → Norway) ===
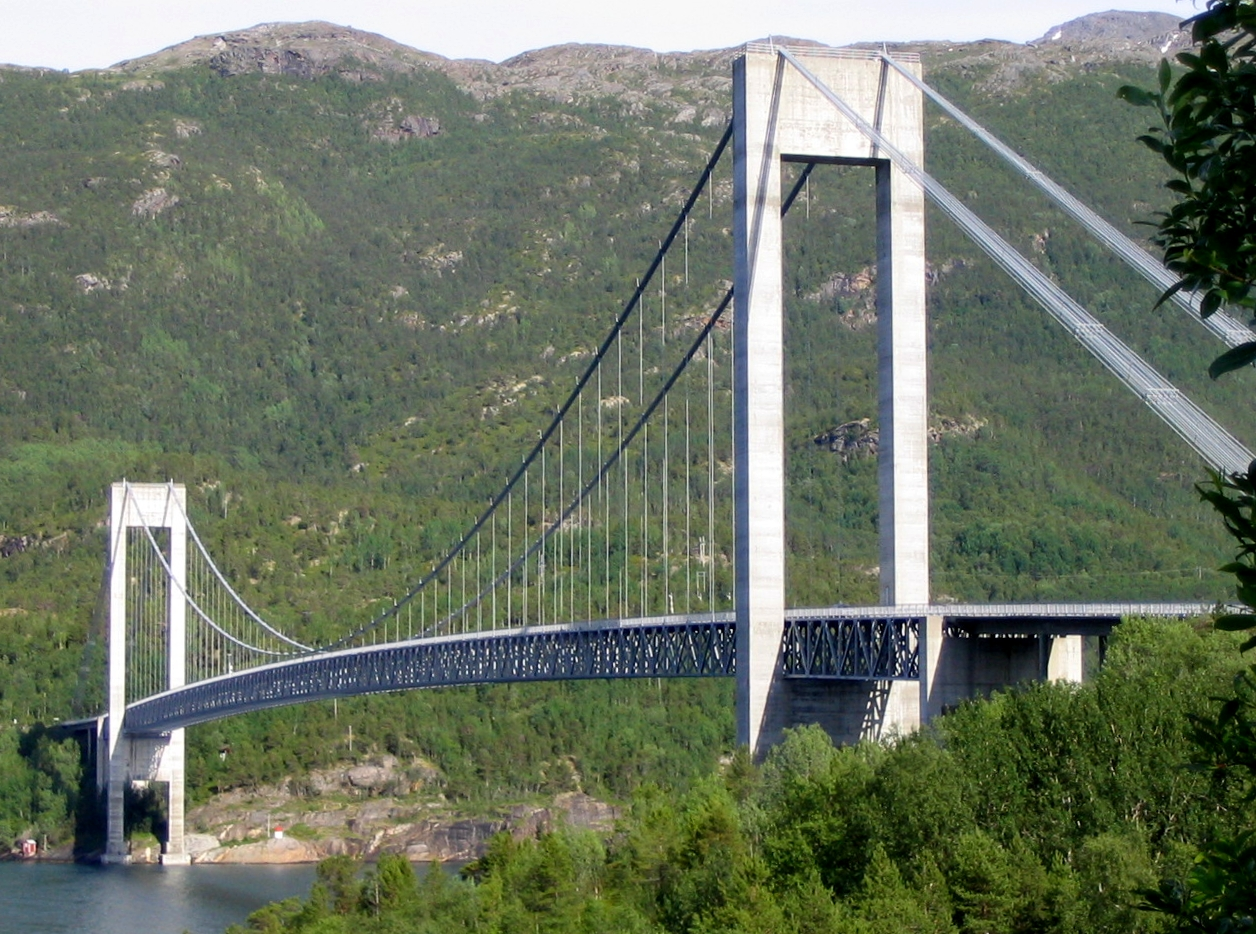
The Roadblock in Norway required racers to rappel down and then ascend the Skjomen Bridge.

- Episode 5: "Tastes Like a Million Dollars" (October 24, 2010)
- Prize: A trip to Manuel Antonio National Park in Costa Rica (awarded to Nat & Kat)
- Eliminated: Katie & Rachel

Locations

- Riksgränsen (Swedish–Norwegian Border)
- Narvik, Norway (Fagernesfjellet Mountain)
- Vidrek (Stornaustet Restaurant)
- Skjomen (Skjomen Bridge)
- Sandtorg (Hårvika)
- Ankenesstranda (Ankenes Marina)

Episode summary

- At the start of this leg, teams had to drive to Narvik, Norway. Once there, teams had to ride the gondola to the top of the Fagernesfjellet Mountain, where they found their next clue.
- In this season's only Fast Forward, one team had to drive themselves to the Stornaustet immersive restaurant in Vidrek and eat an entire serving of smalahove: a boiled sheep's head. Nat & Kat won the Fast Forward.
- Teams who chose to not attempt the Fast Forward had to drive to the Skjomen Bridge, where they found their next clue.
- In this leg's Roadblock, one team member had to rappel off the Skjomen Bridge and then signal for one of two waiting boats to give them their next clue. After retrieving the clue from the boat, the team member had to use a mechanical ascender to return to the bridge deck.
- After the Roadblock, teams had to drive to Hårvika in Sandtorg and find their next clue.
- This leg's Detour was a choice between Bike or Boat. In Bike, teams had to ride a bicycle along a course to a sign, where combinations of numbers and colors were shown. Teams then had to memorize the combination of the color that matched the color on their bicycle lock, return to the starting point, and then use the combination to unlock their next clue. In Boat, teams had to navigate a fishing trawler to a specific location using a map. They then had to deliver two cod and a chainsaw to a summer lodge in exchange for their next clue.
- After the Detour, teams had to check in at the Pit Stop: the Ankenes Marina in Ankenesstranda.

=== Leg 6 (Norway → Sweden → Russia) ===
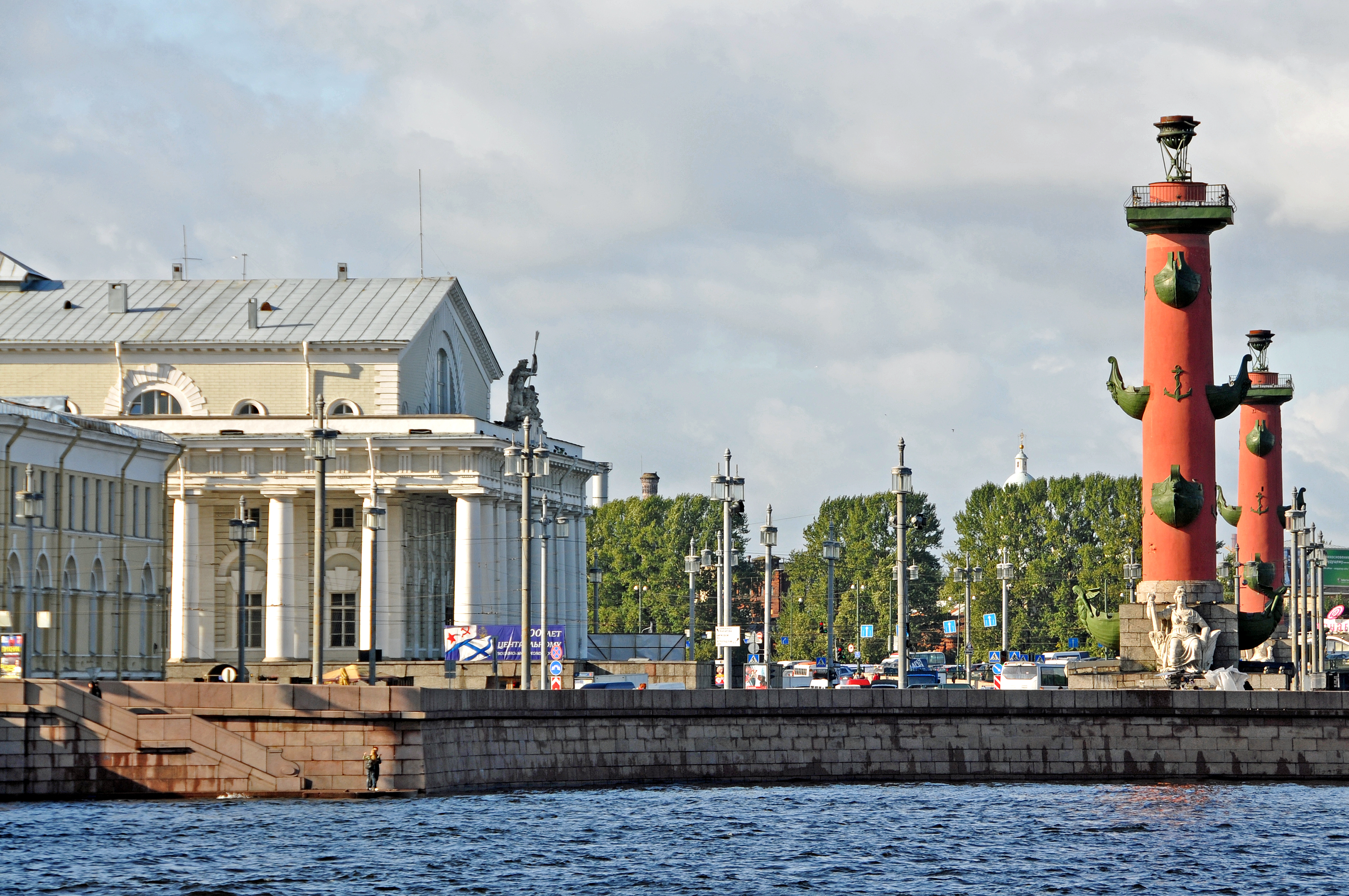
After arriving in Saint Petersburg, teams had to find the Rostral Columns on the spit of Vasilyevsky Island in order to find their clue.

- Episode 6: "Run, Babushka, Run" (October 31, 2010)
- Prize: A trip to São Paulo, Brazil (awarded to Jill & Thomas)

Locations

- Ankenesstranda (Ankenes Marina)
- Narvik → Stockholm, Sweden
- Stockholm → Saint Petersburg, Russia
- Saint Petersburg (Vasilyevsky Island – Rostral Columns)
- Saint Petersburg (Beloselsky-Belozersky Palace or Lenfilm)
- Saint Petersburg (Palace Square)
- Saint Petersburg (Alexandrovskaya – Neighborhood Store)
- Saint Petersburg (Alexander Garden)

Episode summary

- At the start of this leg, teams were instructed to travel by train to Stockholm, Sweden, and then fly to Saint Petersburg, Russia. Once there, teams had to travel to the Rostral Columns on Vasilyevsky Island in order to find their next clue.
- This leg's Detour was a choice between Classical Music or Classic Cinema. In Classical Music, teams had to travel to Beloselsky-Belozersky Palace and listen to three different compositions – Mussorgsky's Pictures at an Exhibition, Rimsky-Korsakov's Scheherazade, and Tchaikovsky's Troika – playing on three numbered gramophones. They then entered a music hall full of pianists playing several different compositions and had to take a copy of the sheet music from the pianist playing one of the three compositions. Once the correct compositions were placed in the correct order, they received their next clue. In Classic Cinema, teams had to travel to Lenfilm and search through several hundred filmstrips until they found one matching the film playing in the theater: Sergei Eisenstein's October: Ten Days That Shook the World. When they showed the correct filmstrip to the projectionist, they received their next clue. Depending on which Detour task they completed, teams were given either a record or a film canister with a photo of the location of their next clue: Palace Square.
- From Palace Square, teams had to travel to the neighborhood store of Alexandrovskaya in order to find their next clue.
- In this leg's Roadblock, one team member had to dress up like a babushka, pick up a sack of fifty potatoes, and fill a wheelbarrow with cow manure. A babushka then showed them how to properly plant the potatoes. Once the potatoes were planted, they received their next clue, which directed them to the Pit Stop: the Alexander Garden, adjacent to Saint Isaac's Cathedral.

Additional note

- This was a non-elimination leg.

=== Leg 7 (Russia) ===
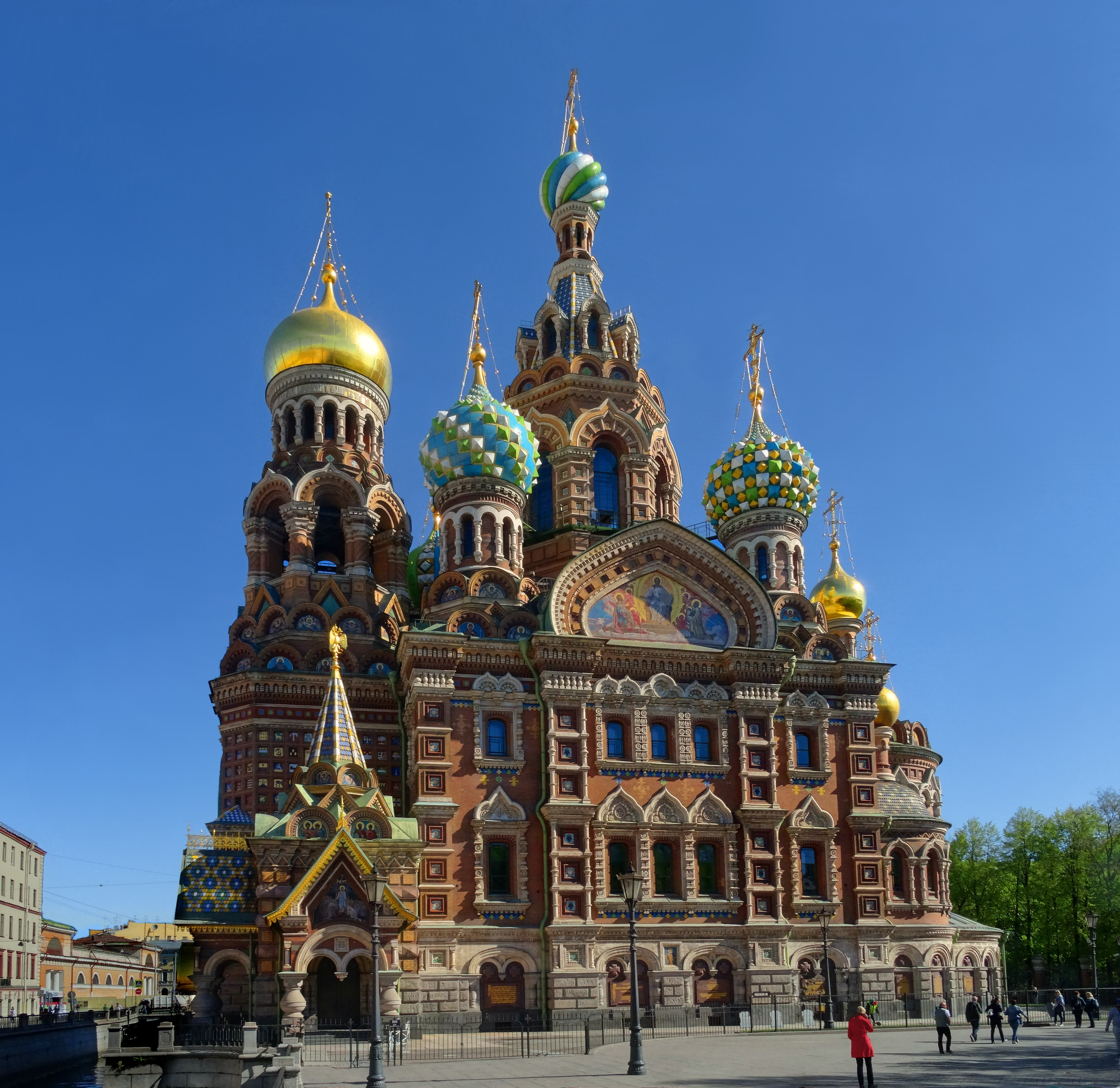
While in Saint Petersburg, teams participated in a "Russian mystery" task where they were brought to the city's famous landmarks, including the Church on Spilled Blood.

- Episode 7: "I Want to Be in the Circus, That's Where I Belong" (November 7, 2010)
- Prize: US$5,000 for each team member (awarded to Nat & Kat)
- Eliminated: Michael & Kevin

Locations

- Saint Petersburg (Alexander Garden)
- Saint Petersburg (Avtovo Circus)
- Saint Petersburg (Bank Bridge)
- Saint Petersburg (1 Vladimirsky Prospekt Tower)
- Saint Petersburg (Church on Spilled Blood)
- Saint Petersburg (Peter and Paul Fortress – Gorodki Courts)
- Saint Petersburg (Peter and Paul Fortress – Naryshkin Bastion)

Episode summary

- At the start of this leg, teams were instructed to travel to the Avtovo Circus in Saint Petersburg, where they found their next clue.
- This leg's Detour was a choice between Circus Band or Circus Clown. In Circus Band, team members had to learn and correctly play a Russian folk song – Ivan Larionov's "Kalinka" – on the accordion in order to receive their next clue. In Circus Clown, teams had to learn plate spinning and get ten plates to spin simultaneously for ten seconds without falling in order to receive their clue.
- After the Detour, teams began a "Russian mystery" task. The first clue was to find the canal bridge guarded by four creatures with golden wings: Bank Bridge. The next clue told teams to travel on foot to the tower at 1 Vladimirsky Prospekt. At the top of the tower, only one team member was allowed to look around for a clue to the next location: a figurine of the Church on Spilled Blood. After locating the figurine, teams then had to walk to the church to get their next clue: "What am I? Peter the Great is buried inside me. The writer Dostoevsky was imprisoned within me. Find me and then search for the Gorodki Courts." Teams had to figure out that their destination was the Peter and Paul Fortress, where they found their next clue.
- In this leg's Roadblock, one team member had to clear three gorodki pin formations by tossing a wooden bat in order to receive their next clue. After two attempts at a formation, the pins were reset.
- After the Roadblock, teams had to check in at the Pit Stop: the Naryshkin Bastion at the Peter and Paul Fortress.

=== Leg 8 (Russia → Oman) ===
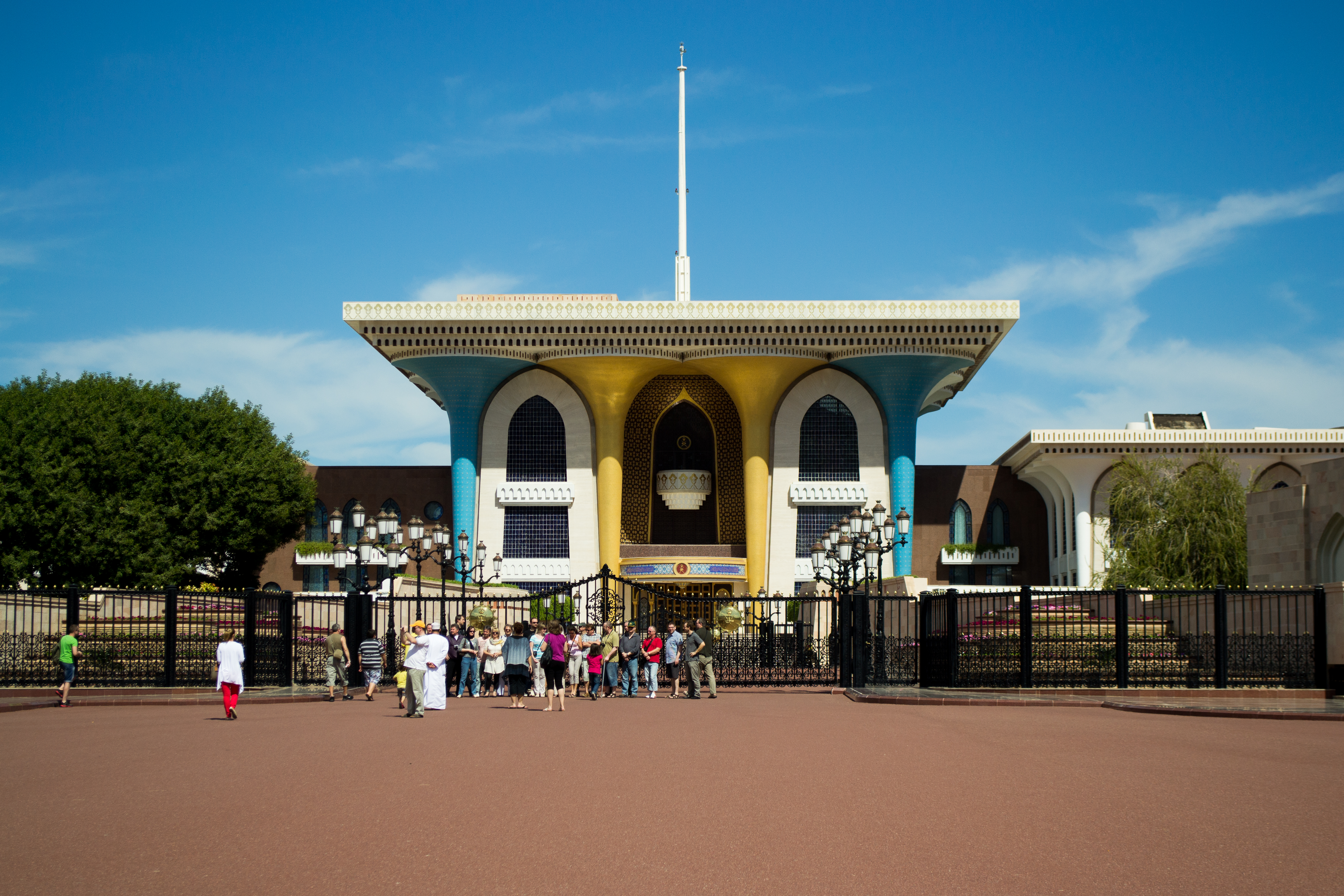
Teams ended this leg in Oman's Sultanate Palace, the Al Alam Palace, in the center of Muscat.

- Episode 8: "Ali Baba in a Suit" (November 14, 2010)
- Prize: A trip for two to Ambergris Caye in Belize (awarded to Chad & Stephanie)
- Eliminated: Gary & Mallory

Locations

- Saint Petersburg (Senate Square – Bronze Horseman)
- Saint Petersburg → Muscat, Oman
- Muscat (Riyam Park – Burj Al Mubkharah)
- Al Hamra (Jebel Shams)
- Nizwa (Stack of Books)
- Muttrah (Muttrah Souq – Ghalib Bakheet Salem Bait Kalshat Al-Mahari Store)
- Muscat (Al Alam Palace)

Episode summary

- At the start of this leg, teams were instructed to fly to Muscat, Oman. Once there, teams had to drive to the Burj Al Mubkharah in Riyam Park, where they were given small silver ingots with three separate times that determined when they could climb the fort's watchtower the next morning. The clue at the watchtower instructed teams to drive themselves to the highest point of Oman: Jebel Shams. At the base of the mountain, a safety driver took teams to their next clue.
- In this leg's Roadblock, one team member had to rappel 500 feet (150 m) down the side of the mountain to a field of hundreds of oil lamps, a handful of which held Aladdin's magic ring. Once they found a lamp with a ring, they could exchange it for their next clue.
- After the Roadblock, teams had to drive to the Stack of Books in Nizwa in order to find their next clue.
- This leg's Detour was a choice between Water Table or Wedding Table. In Water Table, teams have to pump enough water from a well in order to fill a water truck and then direct the truck's driver to deliver the water to a specified house in the neighborhood of Aswat Al Eid in order to receive their next clue. In Wedding Table, teams would have driven to an Arab market and purchased ingredients needed to prepare a traditional Omani dish: maqbous. Once the dish was complete, teams had to serve the dish to a bride and groom in order to receive their next clue. All teams chose Water Table.
- After the Detour, teams had to drive to the Muttrah Souq in Muscat, where they had to find a frankincense vendor and then search the marketplace for "Ali Baba" in order to trade the frankincense for their next clue, which directed them to the Pit Stop: the Al Alam Palace.

=== Leg 9 (Oman → Bangladesh) ===
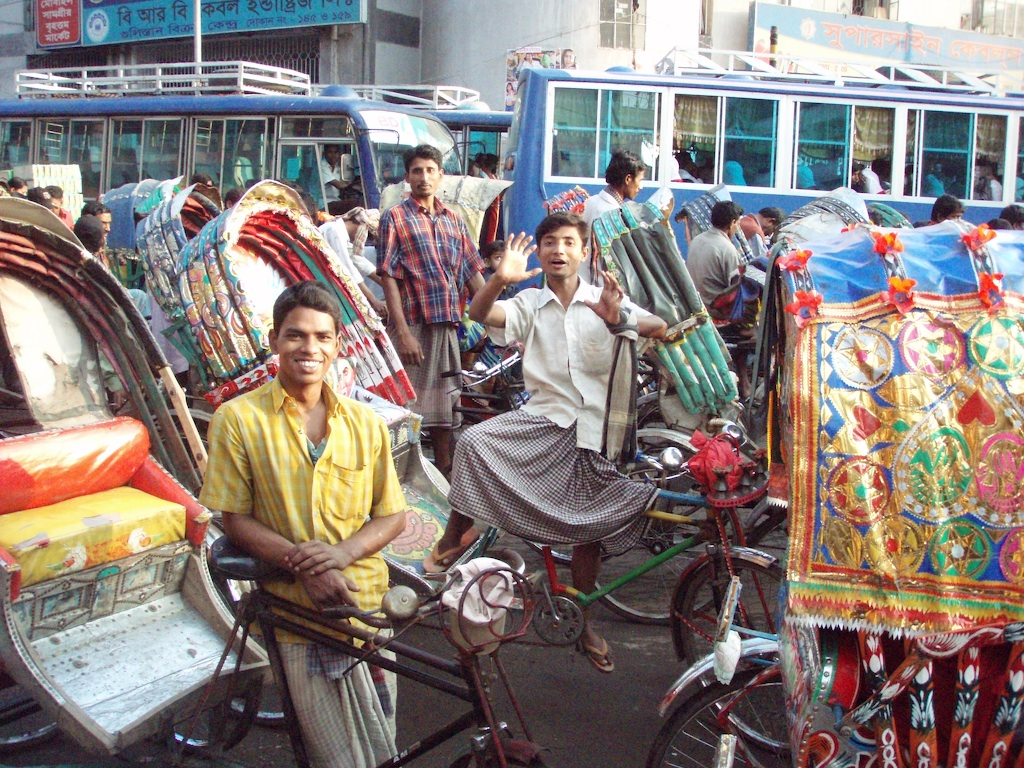
In Dhaka, Bangladesh, teams had to use cycle rickshaws for travel and had to build one at the Roadblock.

- Episode 9: "There's a Lot of Nuts and Bullets" (November 21, 2010)
- Prize: US$15,000 Discover gift card (awarded to Jill & Thomas)
- Eliminated: Chad & Stephanie

Locations

- Muscat (Al Alam Palace)
- Muscat → Dhaka, Bangladesh
- Dhaka (Sundarban Square Supermarket)
- Dhaka (Dhaka Harbor)
- Dhaka (Sadarghat)
- Dhaka (Nazira Bazaar – Tekka Mistiri Rickshaw Garage)
- Dhaka (Lalbagh Fort)

Episode summary

- At the start of this leg, teams were instructed to fly to Dhaka, Bangladesh. Once there, teams had to travel to the Sundarban Square Supermarket, where they had to search for a marked sugarcane stall. There, teams had to press sugarcane to collect enough sugarcane juice to fill a glass and one team member had to drink the juice in order to receive their next clue.
- This leg's Detour was a choice between Balanced Meal or Balanced Bricks. In Balanced Meal, teams had to pick up thirty filled tiffin carriers and take them by boat to a cargo ship in the harbor. After lifting the carriers onto the ship, teams had to bring ten empty carriers back to shore, where they could exchange them for the next clue. In Balanced Bricks, teams had to unload bricks from a supply barge and carry them in baskets on top of their heads to a nearby shop. Once they delivered 100 intact bricks, they received their next clue.
- After the Detour, teams were instructed to go on foot to Sadarghat. Teams then had to travel by cycle rickshaw to the Nazira Bazaar in order to find their next clue.
- In this leg's Roadblock, one team member had to properly assemble a cycle rickshaw using the parts provided in order to receive their next clue, which directed them to the Pit Stop: Lalbagh Fort.

Additional note

- This leg featured a Double U-Turn. Nat & Kat chose to use the U-Turn on Chad & Stephanie, while Jill & Thomas chose to use the U-Turn on Brook & Claire.

=== Leg 10 (Bangladesh → Hong Kong) ===
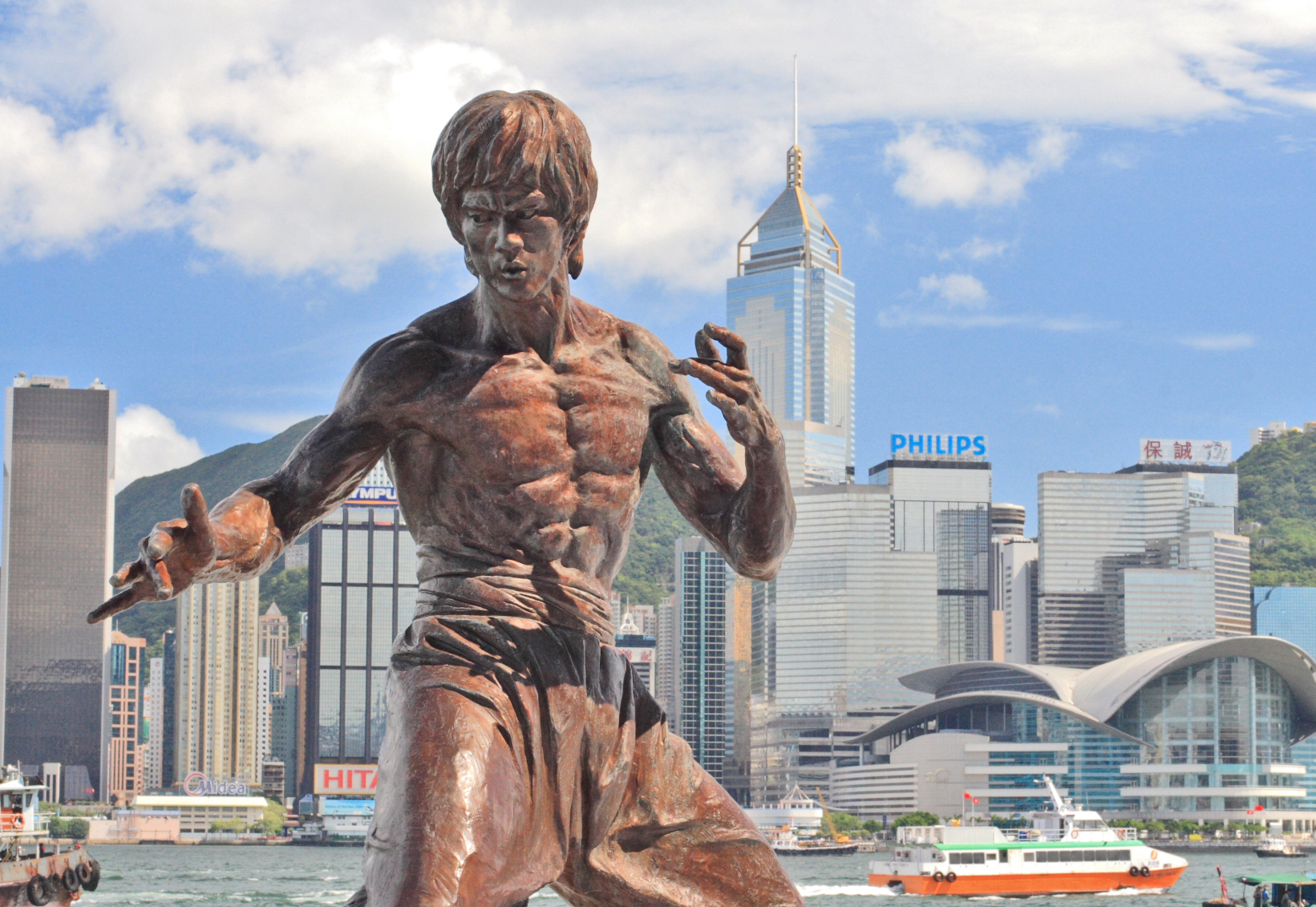
In Hong Kong, teams visited the memorial statue of martial artist and film star Bruce Lee on the Avenue of Stars.

- Episode 10: "I Hate Chinese Food" (November 28, 2010)
- Prize: A trip to Rio de Janeiro, Brazil (awarded to Nat & Kat)

Locations

- Dhaka (Lalbagh Fort)
- Dhaka → Hong Kong
- Hong Kong (Jardine House)
- Hong Kong (Central → Cheung Chau)
- Hong Kong (Cheung Chau – Cheung Po Tsai Cave)
- Hong Kong (Cheung Chau → Kowloon)
- Hong Kong (Majesty Chinese Restaurant)
- Hong Kong (Avenue of Stars – Statue of Bruce Lee)
- Hong Kong (Hong Kong Tramways or Aberdeen Harbour)
- Hong Kong (Statue Square)

Episode summary

- At the start of this leg, teams were instructed to fly to Hong Kong. Once there, teams had to travel by bus and ferry to Cheung Chau, where they had to find the Cheung Po Tsai Cave in order to find their next clue. Teams then had to travel by ferry to Kowloon and travel to the Majesty Chinese Restaurant, where they found their next clue.
- In this leg's Roadblock, one team member had to use chopsticks to search among several plates of food on a buffet for one of five pieces of fake food normally used for display in order to receive their next clue. Team members had to eat any real food that they picked up before they could continue searching.
- After the Roadblock, teams had to travel to the Avenue of Stars and locate the Statue of Bruce Lee in order to find their next clue.
- This leg's Detour was a choice between Ding Ding or Sampan. In Ding Ding, teams would have had to ride the Hong Kong Tramways, colloquially known as the "Ding Ding", between Arsenal Street and the Causeway Bay Terminus, while searching through thousands of signs for three signs (reading Pit Stop, Statue, and Square) which, when combined, would reveal the location of the Pit Stop. In Sampan, teams went to the Jumbo Kingdom's dock and took a pair of budgerigars in a birdcage on a sampan. They then had to search along the Aberdeen Typhoon Shelters for a boat with the registration number matching the number on their birdcage. When they found it, teams could then trade the birdcage for the location of the Pit Stop. Jill & Thomas attempted Ding Ding before switching to Sampan.
- After the Detour, teams had to check in at the Pit Stop: Statue Square, overlooking The Cenotaph.

Additional note

- This was a non-elimination leg.

=== Leg 11 (Hong Kong → South Korea) ===
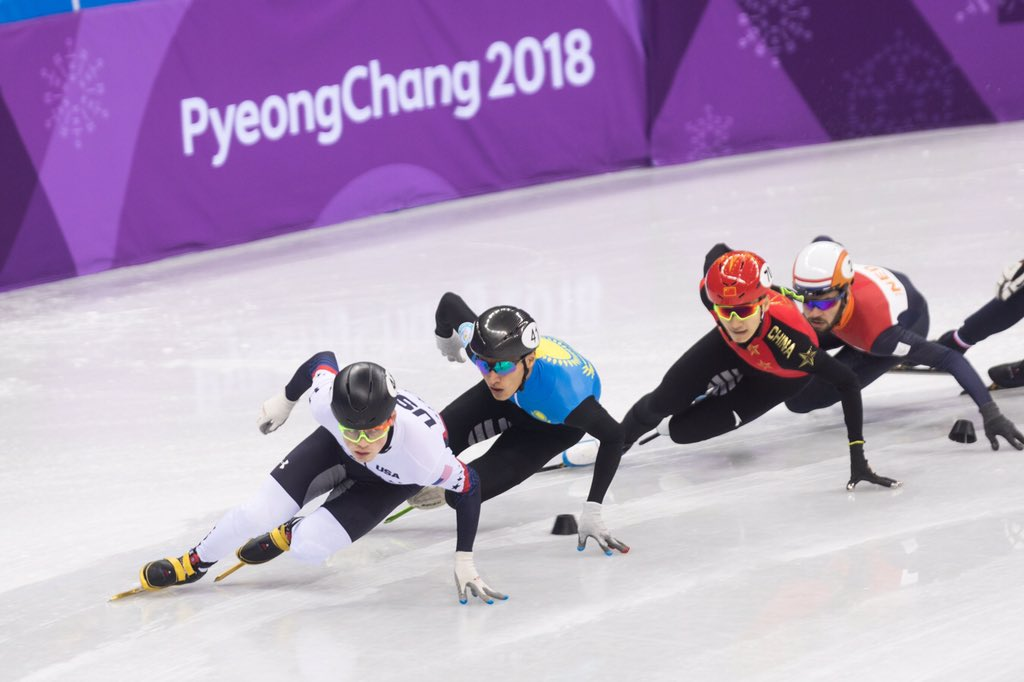
One of the Detour choices in Seoul paid tribute to South Korea's successful short track speed skating results at the Winter Olympics.

- Episode 11: "I'm Surrounded by Ninjas" (December 5, 2010)
- Prize: A trip for two to Iguazú Falls in Argentina (awarded to Jill & Thomas)
- Elimination: Nick & Vicki

Locations

- Hong Kong (Conrad Hong Kong)
- Hong Kong → Seoul, South Korea
- Cheorwon (Seung-il Bridge)
- Dongducheon (Camp Casey)
- Dongducheon → Seoul
- Seoul (Seoul World Cup Stadium)
- Seoul (Mokdong Ice Rink)
- Seoul (Yeouido Hangang Park – Airplane Statue)
- Seoul (Temple of Heaven)

Episode summary

- At the start of this leg, teams were instructed to fly to Seoul, South Korea. Once there, teams had to drive to the Seung-il Bridge in the Korean Demilitarized Zone. There, teams had to whitewater raft down the Hantan River and board a Humvee that took them to Camp Casey in Dongducheon, where they found their next clue.
- In this leg's Roadblock, one team member had to pick a headband and then search among two hundred soldiers practicing taekwondo for the one soldier wearing a matching headband. Once they found the right soldier, the soldier broke open a wooden board that contained their next clue. If they chose the wrong soldier, the soldier took their headband and team members had to retrieve another headband to try again.
- For their Speed Bump, Nick & Vicki had to clean a M109 howitzer. This task was not described by Phil on air because Nick & Vicki had fallen so further behind the other teams on the previous leg.
- After the Roadblock, teams had to travel by subway to the Seoul World Cup Stadium, where they found their next clue.
- This season's final Detour was a choice between Full Throttle or Full Bottle. In Full Throttle, teams had to travel to the Mokdong Ice Rink, where they had to put on short track speed skating suits and complete a two-person skating relay of 24 laps around the rink in order to receive their next clue. In Full Bottle, teams would have had to travel to Namdaemun Market, where they would have had to deliver six large glass jars of ginseng roots to a holistic wellness store without breaking any of them. When they were done, both team members would have had to finish a bottle of tonic in order to receive their next clue. All teams chose Full Throttle.
- After the Detour, teams had to travel to the Yeouido Hangang Park, where they had to search the park for an airplane statue in order to find their next clue, which directed them to the Pit Stop: the Temple of Heaven.

Additional note

- By the time Nick & Vicki made it to the Seung-il Bridge in Cheorwon, all of the other teams had already checked in at the Pit Stop. Although they were only shown performing the Speed Bump and then immediately checking in at the Pit Stop, Nick & Vicki revealed in interviews that they did complete some of the other tasks, but they were at night and would have been "pointless to show."

=== Leg 12 (South Korea → United States) ===
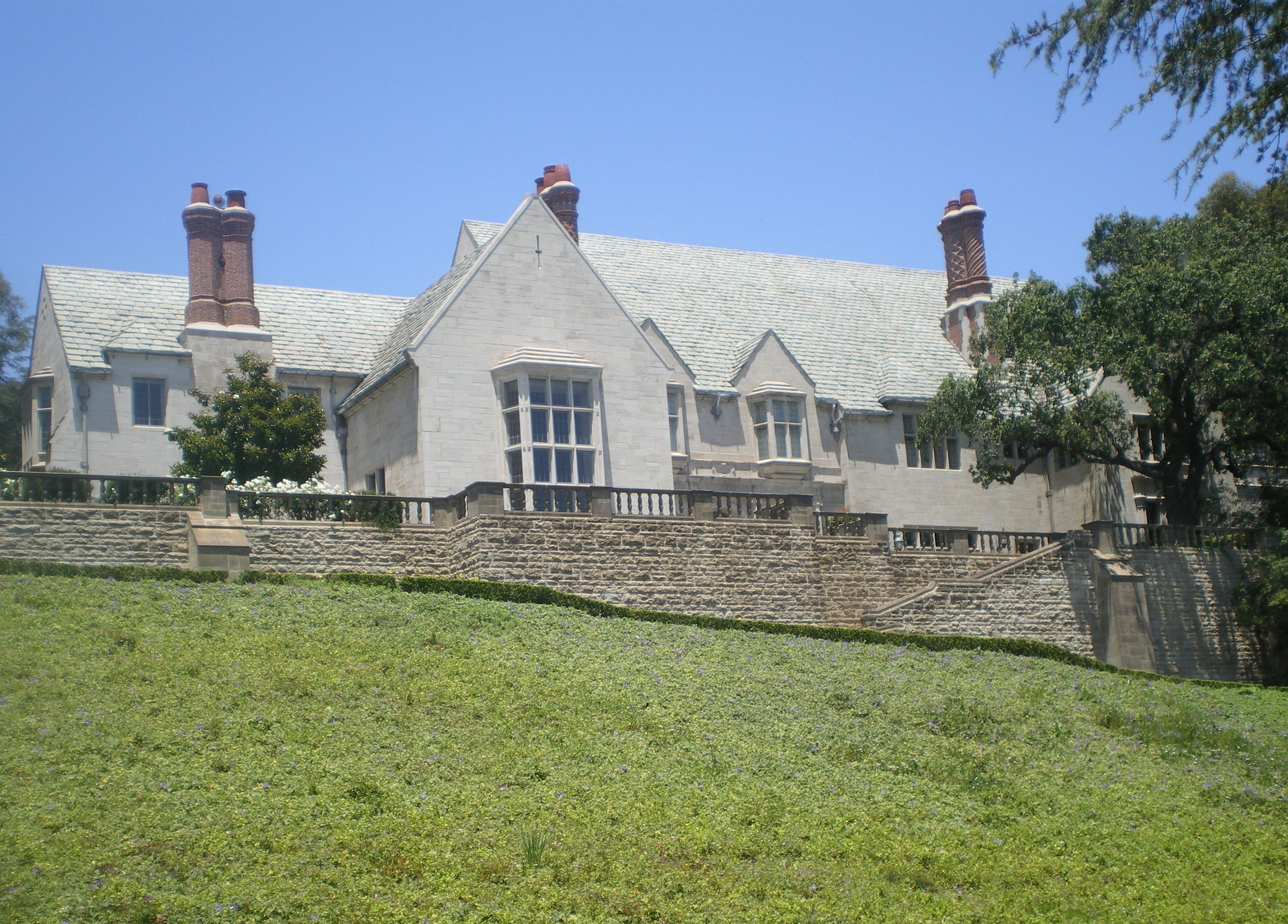
Teams crossed the finish line at the Greystone Mansion in Beverly Hills.

- Episode 12: "Hi. I'm Sorry. I'm in a Race" (December 12, 2010)
- Prize: US$1,000,000
- Winners: Nat & Kat
- Runners-up: Brook & Claire
- Third place: Jill & Thomas

Locations

- Seoul (Millennium Hilton Seoul)
- Seoul → Los Angeles, California
- Long Beach (Port of Long Beach)
- San Pedro → Pasadena (Rose Bowl)
- Los Angeles (Quixote Studios)
- Beverly Hills (Greystone Mansion)

Episode summary

- At the start of this leg, teams were instructed to fly to Los Angeles, California. Once there, teams had to travel to Pier J on the Port of Long Beach, where they had to ride an elevator to the top of one of the pier's gantry cranes before receiving their clue. They were then dropped from the crane on a tandem bungee swing over the water. Once teams were on the pier, they could read their clue, which informed them that they had to ride a helicopter to a surprise destination: the Rose Bowl.
- In this season's final Roadblock, one team member had to decorate three sections of a float for the Tournament of Roses Parade. When racers completed each section correctly, they received their next clue from 2009 Rose Queen Courtney Lee.
- The clue after the Roadblock was presented to teams as three riddles to solve: 1) I am Sancho Panza's master (Don Quixote), 2) I am the place to hear The Symphony in the Glen (Griffith Park), and 3) Monroe's Year of the Itch (The Seven Year Itch). Teams had to combine the answers to figure out their next clue was located at Quixote Studios Stage 7, located near Griffith Park. There, teams were put in front of a large game show-like board that flashed videos of 48 people wearing different kinds of hats, 11 of which were the greeters that welcomed them to the Pit Stops. Teams had to use a control panel to pick the greeters and place them in the order in which they appeared during the season in order to receive their final clue from game show host Bob Eubanks, which directed them to the finish line: Greystone Mansion in Beverly Hills.

== Elimination Station ==
After elimination, the first five eliminated teams were sequestered at a villa in Cancún, Mexico, to await the finale. CBS posted short videos on its website after each episode aired in the Pacific Time Zone to show the eliminated teams interacting at the villa.

- After Leg 1, Ron & Tony were the first team eliminated and were sent to the villa. They expressed their disappointment at being the first team eliminated but decided to make the most of their situation. After they settled into the villa, they decided to go kayaking, remarking how much easier it was compared to the coracle that they unsuccessfully struggled with earlier in the season. Afterward, Ron & Tony sat by the pool and tried to predict who would be the first to join them in the villa, and they agreed that it could be anyone.
- After Leg 2, Andie & Jenna were the second team eliminated and were sent to the villa. Ron and Tony welcomed them, glad to finally have another team at the villa to keep them company. Andie and Jenna revealed that they had only recently met, which shocked and moved both Ron and Tony. Andie and Jenna talked at length about their relationship over dinner with Ron & Tony, with Andie revealing the circumstances surrounding Jenna's adoption, and that she has ten other children.
- Leg 3 was a non-elimination leg; hence, no new teams were sent to the villa. Ron & Tony gave Andie & Jenna salsa dancing lessons. Afterward, Andie & Jenna sat by the pool and discussed their relationship.
- After Leg 4, Connor & Jonathan were the third team eliminated and were sent to the villa. Prior to their arrival, the eliminated teams went on a whale shark watching excursion, but after Andie & Jenna became seasick from the rough waves, everyone returned to the villa without seeing any. Later, Connor & Jonathan arrived and shared the song they sang for Phil when they were eliminated. Connor & Jonathan then recounted what happened on their last leg, claiming that the remaining teams were starting to become more cutthroat – news which disappointed Andie & Jenna.
- After Leg 5, Katie & Rachel were the fourth team eliminated and were sent to the villa. Before their arrival, the three eliminated teams went to Kings Bath, where legend holds that the King bathed his children. Afterward, the three teams speculated on who would show up next, wanting another "fun" team to join them in the villa. Katie and Rachel arrived and immediately expressed how angry and disappointed they were to be eliminated, ignoring the other eliminated teams' attempts to console them. This irritated Ron & Tony, who claimed that Katie & Rachel's bitter attitudes were bringing a negative energy to the house. Later, Katie & Rachel admitted that they did enter the villa in a foul mood, but did not regret anything they had said, further bemoaning the fact that they had lost The Amazing Race.
- Leg 6 was a non-elimination leg; hence, no new teams were sent to the villa. The group played a game of water volleyball together in the villa's pool. Afterward, they went to the beach. Katie & Rachel, still bitter about being eliminated, said that they did not want one of the remaining all-female teams to win the season, since they had wanted to be the first all-female winners.
- After Leg 7, Michael & Kevin were the fifth team eliminated and were sent to the villa. After the other teams went snorkeling during the day, Katie & Rachel continued to state that they wanted an all-female team (specifically Brook & Claire) to be eliminated next, as they still were upset that they would not be the first all-female team to win; the two girls were disappointed when they saw Michael & Kevin arrive. Kevin stated his disappointment at their elimination because of an hour-long penalty, while Michael joked that he was glad to finally be done with the stresses of racing. While alone, Kevin continued to lament their elimination, as they could have potentially gone to Asia, specifically China, where they would have had a linguistic advantage, but Michael told him to just drop the issue. The next day, the eliminated teams visited Punta Sur, where Katie & Rachel spoke with Michael & Kevin about their elimination. Michael told the group that none of them should dwell on losing, and that it should be a learning experience on how to accept even the biggest disappointments in life.
- After Leg 8, Gary & Mallory were the sixth team eliminated. The teams gathered around a phone, waiting for a call to see who was eliminated. Before the call, Jenna stated that she and Rachel had dreams the previous night that either Gary & Mallory or Brook & Claire were eliminated. Katie & Rachel stated, again, that they wanted Brook & Claire to be eliminated. Everyone was surprised when Gary & Mallory called, and told the teams that it was the hardest leg ever, and that they traveled for 16 hours and ended up losing to Nat & Kat with minutes to spare. After the call, the teams continued to comment on Katie & Rachel's obsession that an all-female team should not win The Amazing Race this season. The next day, the eliminated teams went down to the docks to pick up an amberjack and then cook it in the traditional Mayan Tikin Xic style. Once the food was prepared, Andie told everyone that it reminded her of home and being with family, and that the eliminated teams were her substitute family, and Connor joked that she was their substitute birth mom. Later, Ron & Tony spoke with Andie about her relationship with Jenna, and Andie said that whatever Jenna wanted to do from this point on was fine with her.
- After Leg 9, Chad & Stephanie were the seventh team eliminated. Connor & Jonathan spoke about how they felt the fact that they did not attend their graduation at Princeton makes it better that they did not have the transition from college student into adulthood. Later, the eliminated teams went to Alux, an underground restaurant inside a natural cavern, and Jenna had everyone around the table say what they learned from their time on The Amazing Race.
- Leg 10 was a non-elimination leg, but this Elimination Station featured eliminated teams waiting for the phone call with Chad & Stephanie calling the villa after their elimination in Leg 9. They told the other teams how being U-Turned by Nat & Kat had led to their elimination, and then shared the news about their engagement. Ron joked with them by asking if the elimination affected their engagement. The eliminated teams discussed who they wanted in the Top 3, with Nat & Kat and Brook & Claire both mentioned. Jokes were made about Katie & Rachel's dislike that an all-female team might win and that it was not going to be them. Later, all the eliminated teams packed up and prepared for their flight to the final destination city. Michael finally admitted to Kevin that if he were more confident in himself, they might have been able to go farther in the competition. Andie & Jenna were glad that they would be returning home soon, and Jenna expressed how she felt about her relationship with her biological mother. As the eliminated teams left he villa, all of them speculated on what the final destination would be, with guesses ranging from somewhere in Arizona to Seattle to New York City.
- After Leg 11, Nick & Vicki were the eighth and final team eliminated. Elimination Station showed the five eliminated teams arriving at the final destination in Los Angeles, California. After arriving in Los Angeles, the teams checked into a hotel, settled into their rooms, and awaited the phone call from the eighth team eliminated. Ron commented that he and Tony were in their home city; Kevin commented that there would be a lot of interesting things to do in Los Angeles, while also saying to his father what it would be like if they were still racing; and Andie and Jenna discussed how their future relationship would develop. Later, the teams gathered to get the call from the field to learn that Nick & Vicki had been eliminated. Vicki mentioned how she had gotten sick in the previous leg and their penalty had contributed to their loss. Nick said that he believed that Jill & Thomas would win, as they had been coming in first lately, but Vicki said that she thought Nat & Kat would win. The eliminated teams joked that Rachel would physically attack either Brook & Claire or Nat & Kat if they came across the finish line first; although Rachel said she was no longer upset that an all-female team could win this season.
- Leg 12 was the final leg of The Amazing Race 17. Elimination Station showed the Finish Line that took place in Greystone Mansion. Gary & Mallory, Chad & Stephanie, and Nick & Vicki reunited with the other eliminated teams. Andie asked to see Stephanie's engagement ring, and she told the others that they had finished in first place that leg and won a trip to Belize for their honeymoon. Tony led the eliminated teams in a dance before waiting for the remaining teams to cross the Finish Line. All the eliminated teams were waiting to find out who would cross the Finish Line first and win $1,000,000. When they found out that Nat & Kat crossed the Finish Line first and won $1,000,000, everyone congratulated them on being the first all-female team to win. Rachel, although still upset that she and Katie were not that team, said she was still happy for their win. The teams then greeted Brook & Claire as they crossed the Finish Line in 2nd Place, with everyone noting that the top two teams were both female teams. When Jill & Thomas finally crossed the Finish Line in 3rd Place, Thomas conceded that even though he and Jill were top competitors, Nat & Kat and Brook & Claire were truly the top two teams. Teams expressed their opinions about the final three teams at the Finish Line along with their joys and disappointments and the learning experiences they could draw from it.

== Reception ==
=== Critical response ===
The Amazing Race 17 received mixed-to-positive reviews. Andy Dehnart of reality blurred wrote that it was "an average (at best) season, one plagued by a consistent lack of surprise, few actually challenging challenges, and a lot of stupidity." Scott Von Doviak of The A.V. Club wrote that "the season has been somewhat less than amazing, exhibiting the same flaws that have plagued the last several editions of the long-running series: lackluster challenges, repetitive airport and taxicab drama, too many unlikeable teams, too many equalizing points along the route, and a distinct lack of suspense at the end of too many legs." Luke Dwyer of TV Fanatic wrote that this season had "an unusually likable cast. Only a handful of contestants were the kind you actively root against and even those were tamed by The Amazing Race standards. Instead we were treated to a cast without a dominant group, but one that was easy to root for." Daron Aldridge of Box Office Prophets wrote "This one started out strong with high entertainment and drama but over the last couple episodes, it has gotten predictable and, dare I say, boring at times. Overall though, I am very pleased with how it played out because the best team truly did win." In 2016, this season was ranked 3rd out of the first 27 seasons by the Rob Has a Podcast Amazing Race correspondents. Likewise in 2021, Jane Andrews of Gossip Cop also ranked this season as the show's 3rd best season. Val Barone of TheThings ranked this season as the show's 2nd best season. In 2022, Jason Shomer of Collider ranked this season among the show's top seven seasons. In 2022, Rhenn Taguiam of Game Rant ranked this season as the eighth-best season. In 2024, Taguiam's ranking was updated with this season ranked 13th out of 36.

== Ratings ==
=== U.S. Nielsen ratings ===
#	Airdate	Episode	Rating	Share	Rating/Share	Viewers	Rank	Rank	Rank	Rank
#	Airdate	Episode	Households		18–49	(millions)	Timeslot (Viewers)	Timeslot (18–49)	Week (Viewers)	Week (18–49)
1	September 26, 2010	"They Don't Call It The Amazing Race For Nothin!"	6.3	10	3.7/9	11.54	#2	#2	#26	—N/a
2	October 3, 2010	"A Kiss Saves the Day"	6.2	10	3.4/9	10.67	#2	#2	#28	#25
3	October 10, 2010	"In Phil We Trust"	6.9	11	3.8/9	11.99	#3	#3	#20	#13
4	October 17, 2010	"We Should Have Brought Gloves and Butt Pads"	6.3	10	3.5/9	10.94	#2	#2	#21	#21
5	October 24, 2010	"Tastes Like a Million Dollars"	6.7	10	3.4/8	11.42	#2	#2	#20	#19
6	October 31, 2010	"Run, Babushka, Run"	5.3	9	2.6/7	9.09	#3	#3	(<#25)	(<#25)
7	November 7, 2010	"I Want to Be in the Circus, That's Where I Belong"	6.5	10	3.3/8	11.01	—N/a	—N/a	#20	#23
8	November 14, 2010	"Ali Baba in a Suit"	6.0	9	2.8/7	10.34	#2	#2	—N/a	—N/a
9	November 21, 2010	"There's a Lot of Nuts and Bullets"	6.2	9	3.0/7	10.59	#2	#2	#24	—N/a
10	November 28, 2010	"I Hate Chinese Food"	6.3	10	3.1/8	11.07	—N/a	—N/a	#13	#17
11	December 5, 2010	"I'm Surrounded by Ninjas"	6.1	9	3.1/8	10.34	#2	#2	#17	#14
12	December 12, 2010	"Hi. I'm Sorry. I'm in a Race"	7.0	11	3.7/9	12.12	#2	#2	#11	#10

- Episode 6, "Run, Babushka, Run", aired on Halloween when viewership was down for all shows and where it went up against Sunday Night Football and Game 4 of the World Series.

=== Canadian ratings ===
Canadian broadcaster CTV also aired The Amazing Race on Sundays at 8pm Eastern, Central, & Atlantic (9pm Pacific & Mountain).

#	Airdate	Episode	Viewers (millions)	Rank (Week)
1	September 26, 2010	"They Don't Call It The Amazing Race For Nothin!"	2.44	#8
2	October 3, 2010	"A Kiss Saves the Day"	2.62	#3
3	October 10, 2010	"In Phil We Trust"	2.30	#7
4	October 17, 2010	"We Should Have Brought Gloves and Butt Pads"	2.99	#1
5	October 24, 2010	"Tastes Like a Million Dollars"	2.72	#2
6	October 31, 2010	"Run, Babushka, Run"	2.36	#6
7	November 7, 2010	"I Want to Be in the Circus, That's Where I Belong"	2.67	#4
8	November 14, 2010	"Ali Baba in a Suit"	2.79	#2
9	November 21, 2010	"There's a Lot of Nuts and Bullets"	2.63	#3
10	November 28, 2010	"I Hate Chinese Food"	2.51	#4
11	December 5, 2010	"I'm Surrounded by Ninjas"	2.68	#1
12	December 12, 2010	"Hi. I'm Sorry. I'm in a Race"	2.74	#1

- Episode 3, "In Phil We Trust", aired on the Sunday before Canadian Thanksgiving Day.
