= Kaneshie Storm Drain =

Stormwater drainage infrastructure project in Accra, Ghana

- Location: Kaneshie, Greater Accra Region, Ghana
- Owner: Government of Ghana
- Country: Ghana
- Budget: Part of GARID Project financing
- Status: Unknown

The Kaneshie Storm Drain is a major flood-control infrastructure project located in Kaneshie, a commercial and transport hub in the Greater Accra Region of Ghana. It is a key component of the Greater Accra Resilient and Integrated Development (GARID) Project, a multi-faceted urban resilience initiative funded by World Bank. Its primary goal is to mitigate the severe, chronic flooding that has repeatedly disrupted the Kaneshie Market, one of the city's largest, and the surrounding arterial road network.

== Background ==
Greater Accra faces perennial flooding, causing significant economic damage and loss of life. The Kaneshie area, situated within the densely urbanised Odaw River Basin, has been identified as a critical flood hotspot. Rapid urbanisation, inadequate waste management , and the encroachment of structures on natural waterways have drastically reduced drainage capacity. The World Bank's foundational project document confirms that the "absence of adequate drainage infrastructure in key areas like Kaneshie" leads to frequent and severe flooding, justifying the project as a priority intervention. The project involved the construction of an underground drainage system stretching from Accra Academy to Pamprom Junction. The second project ran from the Bank of Ghana Headquarters, joining the South Kaneshie Drain, then finally made to discharge into the Odaw River.

== Design and construction ==
The Kaneshie Storm Drain falls under Component 2 (Flood Risk Management and Drainage) of the GARID Project. The work involved clearing encroaching structures and constructing a new, high-capacity reinforced concrete channel. This drain is engineered to capture stormwater from the market and the heavily congested Kaneshie-Mallam highway and convey it safely into the larger Odaw channel. In July 2023, the contracting engineer reported that the Kaneshie drain works were "70 % complete" and that upon completion, the drain would permanently resolve the severe flooding that had historically submerged the market and adjacent lorry terminal.

== Funding and administration ==
The project is financed through a credit from the International Development Association (IDA) of the World Bank, initially with a US$200 million facility approved in 2019. In June 2024, the World Bank Board approved an additional US$150 million in financing to scale up the project's flood resilience activities, directly benefiting the continued work on priority drains like that at Kaneshie. The project is administered by the Ministry of Works and Housing through the GARID Project Coordinating Unit.

=== Social impact and safeguards ===
The drain directly protects the livelihoods of thousands of traders at Kaneshie Market and the tens of thousands of daily commuters who pass through the area. As part of the project's social safeguards, a Resettlement Action Plan (RAP) was implemented to compensate and assist those displaced by the clearing of the drainage reserve. The specific commitments for managing these social risks are detailed in the project's Environmental and Social Commitment Plan (ESCP), a publicly available legal agreement between the Government of Ghana and the World Bank.

=== Challenges ===
Implementing a large infrastructure project in a dense urban market has presented challenges. The clearance of encroachers required significant community engagement and the timely payment of compensation, as tracked in the project's implementation progress reports. The Ghana News Agency reported in August 2023 that the project was pushing to complete key drains by year's end, acknowledging the delicate balance between engineering works and community relocation logistics.
