= The Good Buy Girls =

American reality television series

- Genre: Reality
- Starring: Brook Roberts; Tara Gray
- Country of origin: United States
- Original language: English
- No. of seasons: 1
- No. of episodes: 10 (2 unaired)

Production
- Camera setup: Multiple
- Running time: 22 minutes
- Production company: True Entertainment

Original release
- Network: TLC
- Release: June 5, 2013 – May 16, 2014

The Good Buy Girls is an American reality television series on TLC that premiered on June 5, 2013. The show follows the lives of home shopping presenters Tara Gray and Brook Roberts and their plans of expanding DSN Jewelry.

== Tara Gray ==
Tara Gray
- Born: Tara Tucker; Birmingham, Alabama, U.S.
- Beauty pageant titleholder
- Title: Miss Alabama Teen USA 1997; Miss Alabama USA 2002
- Hair color: Auburn
- Eye color: Brown
- Major competitions: Miss Teen USA 1997; Miss USA 2002

Tara Gray (née Tucker) is a TV host, writer and producer, as well as a former beauty queen who has competed in the Miss Teen USA and Miss USA pageants. She has worked as a local journalist, reporter and entertainment presenter, as well as a national TV host and reporter.

== Broadcast ==
Despite there being 12 episodes ordered the series was cancelled after four episodes and the remaining eight episodes were pulled from the schedule. Another six episodes were aired in May 2014.

The series premiered in Australia on August 19, 2015 on the Style Network.

== Episodes ==
No.	Title	Original release date
1	"Tans and Tantrums"	June 5, 2013
2	"This Show Has Gone to the Dogs!"	June 5, 2013
3	"Heels & Deception"	June 12, 2013
4	"Saving Face"	June 12, 2013
5	"The Heat Is On!"	May 14, 2014
6	"A Camper's Life for Me"	May 14, 2014
7	"Tears at DSN"	May 15, 2014
8	"I Love Your Guts"	May 15, 2014
9	"Bars and Blackouts"	May 16, 2014
10	"Fabio-lous"	May 16, 2014
11	TBA	Has not aired
12	TBA	Has not aired
