= Stephanie Murray Smith =

American beauty pageant titleholder (born 1987)

Stephanie Smith
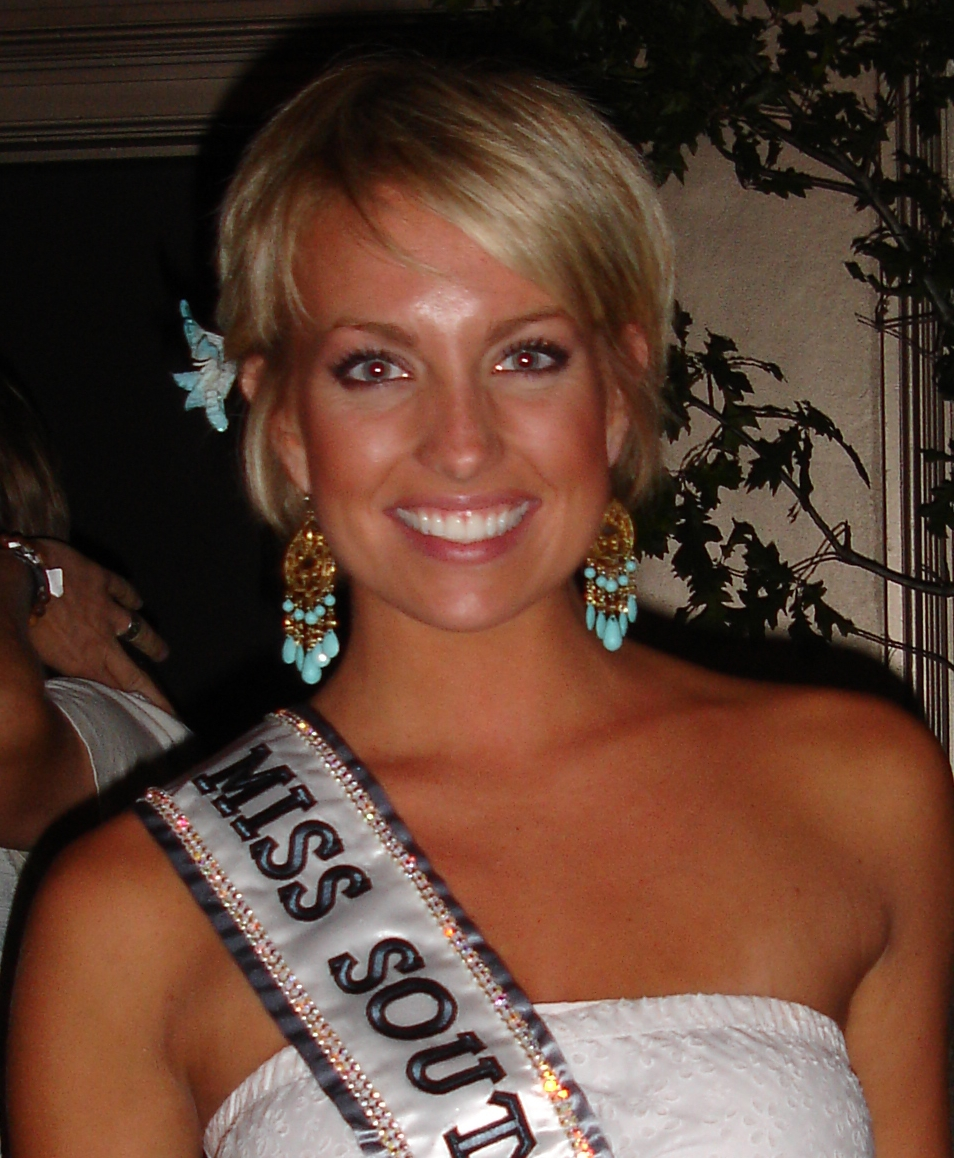
- Born: Stephanie Murray Smith; August 1987 (age 39); Charleston, South Carolina, U.S.
- Occupations: Make-up artist and hairstylist
- Height: 1.70 m (5 ft 7 in)
- Spouse: Chad Waltrip (2010-present)
- Beauty pageant titleholder
- Title: Miss South Carolina USA 2009
- Hair color: Blonde
- Major competitions: Miss USA 2009 (Top 10)

Stephanie Murray Smith Waltrip (born August 1987) is an American television personality, make-up artist, hairstylist, and beauty pageant titleholder from the United States who was crowned Miss South Carolina USA and placed in the Top 10 at Miss USA. In 2010, she competed on The Amazing Race 17 with then boyfriend Chad Waltrip and finished fifth. He proposed to her while on the Race. They were married later in 2010 after the Race.

== Early life ==
Born in Charleston to Randy Smith of Summerville and Luanne Marie Bass-Smith of Goose Creek, Smith is the oldest of four children, growing up in Goose Creek with younger brothers Nicholas Andrew, Jackson Ryan; and little sister Maggie Louise.

A nationally ranked swimmer, Smith graduated from Stratford High School in 2005 and studied cosmetology at Charleston Institute of Cosmetology. She would work with photographer Michael Petry, assisting him with make-up and hairstyling, and was pursuing a career in hospitality and tourism at Trident Technical College prior to her winning Miss South Carolina USA.

== Miss South Carolina USA ==
Smith's first foray into pageantry came in 2004 while she was a junior in high school, when a local pageant director asked her to participate in Miss Teen Charleston USA, a title she would win. At the next level, Smith realized she needed to learn more in order to win a state title and took this experience as a stepping stone to her future participation in pageants.

Two years later, in 2006, Smith participated as Miss Charleston USA in Miss South Carolina USA and placed fourth runner-up. Feeling close to the crown, Smith competed in 2007, this time as Miss Summerville USA, and again finished fourth runner-up. A year later, in November 2008, Smith won the title of Miss South Carolina USA, gaining the right to represent her state in Miss USA 2009.

As the official representative of South Carolina, Smith participated in local events and competed in the 2009 Miss USA pageant, broadcast live from Las Vegas, Nevada on April 19, 2009, where she placed as one of the Top 10 finalists.

== The Amazing Race ==
In 2010, Smith competed in The Amazing Race 17 with then-boyfriend Chad Walthrip. The show premiered on September 26. Their worst placement was an eighth-place finish in Leg 1 and their best was a first-place finish in Leg 8.

While on the race, Waltrip surprised Smith when he proposed her to marry him and she accepted. In Leg 9, they finished in fifth place and were eliminated.

She later moved to Jacksonville, Florida and became a co-owner of a hair salon.

Awards and achievements
Preceded by Jamie Hill	Miss South Carolina USA; 2009	Succeeded by Rachel Law
