= Brook Roberts =

American reality television personality

- Born: December 22, 1982
- Beauty pageant titleholder
- Title: Miss Douglas County 2004; Miss Oregon 2004
- Major competition: Miss America 2005

Brook Roberts (born December 22, 1982) is an American reality television personality and a former beauty queen who held the title of Miss Oregon 2004 and competed in the Miss America 2005 pageant. From 2006 to its closure in 2010, she was a host on Gems TV. Roberts and Tara Gray star in the reality-TV series The Good Buy Girls on TLC in 2013. It was canceled after four episodes due to low viewership and only 10 of the ordered 12 episodes have been broadcast.

On February 28, 2014, Roberts became a co-host of #SDLive, San Diego's regional weekly sports show, on Fox Sports San Diego.

== Miss Oregon ==
Roberts was raised in Roseburg, Oregon, where she attended Sutherlin High School. She went on to Southern Oregon University with majors in Communications and Journalism, earning a Bachelor of Arts degree for the latter. Roberts competed at Miss Oregon 2004 as Miss Douglas County. Her platform was "Providing a Voice for Abused and Neglected Children", and her talent was a Vocal Performance.

== The Amazing Race ==
Roberts competed on The Amazing Race 17 with her co-worker and best friend Claire Champlin. This edition of CBS's The Amazing Race was filmed from May to June 2010 and premiered on September 26, 2010. The team's best placement was first place in the second leg. They ended the race in second, becoming the fifth all-female team to do so after Dustin & Kandice (All Stars), Jaime & Cara (Season 14), Pamela & Vanessa (Asia Season 2), and Claire & Michelle (Asia Season 4).

Awards and achievements
Preceded by April Robinson	Miss Oregon; 2004	Succeeded by Lucy Fleck
