= Skjomen Bridge =

Skjomen Bridge Skjombrua
- View of the bridge
- Coordinates: 68°22′15″N 17°14′27″E
- Carries: E6
- Crosses: Skjomen
- Locale: Narvik Municipality, Norway

Characteristics
- Total length: 711 metres (2,333 ft)
- Longest span: 525 metres (1,722 ft)
- No. of spans: 9
- Clearance below: 35 metres (115 ft)

History
- Opened: 1972

The Skjomen Bridge (Norwegian: Skjombrua) is a suspension bridge in Narvik Municipality in Nordland county, Norway. The bridge is part of the European route E6 highway. It crosses the Skjomen fjord about 15 kilometres (9.3 mi) west of the town of Narvik. The 711-metre (2,333 ft) bridge has a main span of 525 metres (1,722 ft). The maximum clearance to the sea is 35 metres (115 ft). The bridge has nine spans. The Skjomen Bridge was opened in 1972. Between 1938 and 1972 there was a car ferry here, going on a route about 400 meters north of the present bridge.

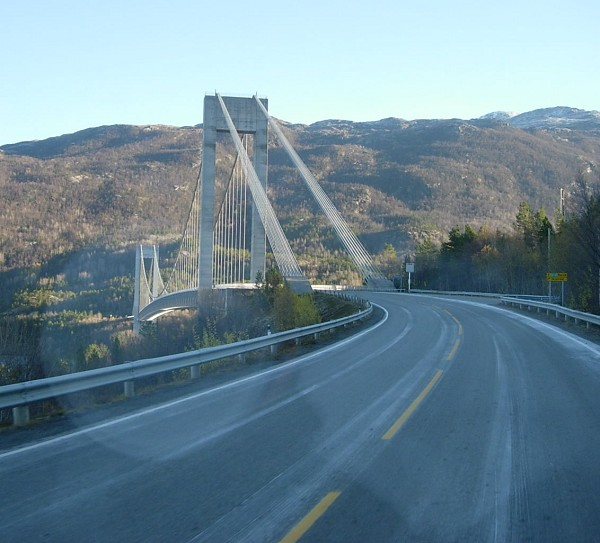
The Skjomen bridge from the south side of the Skjomen fjord

== In popular culture ==
The "Roadblock" task for the fifth episode of The Amazing Race 17 was filmed at this bridge. The contestant had to rappel down a rope hanging from the bridge and then climb back up the rope.
