= Ron Kellum =

American film director

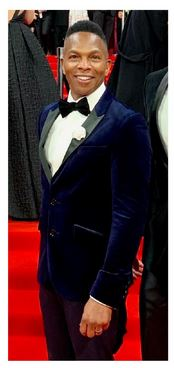
- Ron Kellum at the BAFTAs February 2020; Photo by Gracie Valdez
- Born: Ronald Kellum; February 1, 1965 (age 61); Amarillo, TX
- Occupations: Producer; Director; Artist; Choreographer
- Years active: 1991–present
- Website: Ron Kellum Official Website

Ron Kellum (born February 1, 1965) is an American producer, director, artist and choreographer known for being a Broadway veteran and the first African-American artistic director for the award-winning Cirque du Soleil. He was the artistic director for the productions of Koozå from 2015 through 2016 and Volta from 2018 through 2020.

In 2010, Kellum appeared on the seventeenth season of the CBS reality competition The Amazing Race.

== Early life ==
Born Ronald Dexter Kellum on February 1, 1965, in Amarillo, Texas, to parents and business owners Willie Kellum and Mary Kellum (née Osby). Kellum grew up in Denver, Colorado, where he started his career in theater at age 12. Kellum was raised in the church where his parents gave him the foundation for his spirituality. Kellum attended and graduated from Manual High School in 1983.

== Career ==
Kellum started his career appearing in theatrical musicals on and off Broadway. In 1994, he was in the original revival cast of the Broadway production of Joseph and the Amazing Technicolor Dreamcoat at The Minskoff Theatre. Kellum was cast in the Broadway production of Chicago in 1998. Kellum appeared in the productions of Fame (1994) and Beauty and The Beast at the Shubert Theater in Los Angeles (1996). In 1998, Kellum was cast as Sergeant Fogarty and The Doctor from 1998 until 2000 in the first national tour of the award-winning musical Chicago. Kellum also appeared in the productions of Smokey Joe's Cafe, Hello, Dolly!, and The Wiz (2006). He also appeared in a production of Dreamgirls in 2004.

Kellum started producing, directing and/or choreographing theatrical productions in 2005 when he directed a production of "Once on This Island" at Fullerton Civic Light Opera in Fullerton, CA. He then directed and choreographed the production of Dreamgirls in 2008 at the San Diego Musical Theatre. His production of Dreamgirls was awarded "Outstanding Resident Musical" at the Seventh Annual Craig Noel Awards for Theatrical Excellence. In that same year, Kellum directed and choreographed the production of Five Guys Named Moe starring Tony and Grammy awards winner Leslie Odom Jr., in 2011, he also directed "Five Guys Named Moe" at the Red Mountain Theatre Company in Birmingham, AL. In 2010, Kellum directed the production of the musical, Rent at Lewis Family Playhouse in Victoria Gardens, Rancho Cucamonga, CA., and in 2012 at the San Diego Music Theatre. Kellum directed the musical production of Chicago in 2012 at Oklahoma University, the San Diego Music Theater and at the Sacramento Music Circus in 2013. Also in 2013, Kellum directed the production of The Wedding Singer at the Red Mountain Theatre in Birmingham, Al. In that same year he directed the production of A Chorus Line at the San Diego Music Theatre and at the Rancho Cucamonga Performing Arts. Kellum directed the production of Jesus Christ Superstar in 2017 at the Paramount Theatre in Aurora, IL. His production ran from April 19, 2017 - May 28, 2017. Kellum's production featured an all-Black cast, which is a rarity.

Kellum has been the co-producer and co-director for the NFL Pro Bowl Half-time Show in Hawaii and Orlando and the co-executive director for the NFL Pro Bowl Cheerleaders from 2000 through 2020. Kellum has co-produced the NFL United Way Thanksgiving Day Half-Time Show as well. In 2012, Kellum co-directed and choreographed the production of The Color Purple at the Red Mountain Theatre Co., in Birmingham, Al.

As a choreographer, Kellum choreographed the stage productions of Ain't Misbehavin in 2004, Five Guys Named Moe in 2008, starring Leslie Odom Jr. in 2010, and The Wedding Singer in 2013 at the Red Mountain Theatre Company in Birmingham, AL.

In 2010, Kellum was the choreographer for the motion picture, Iron Man 2 starring Robert Downey Jr. He choreographed the scene with the Ironette Dancers.

=== Cirque du Soleil ===
In 2015, Kellum became the first African American artistic director for Cirque du Soleil, with the productions of Koozå, from 2015 through 2016 and Volta, from 2018 through 2020. The production of Volta ended due to Covid-19, causing cancellations throughout the country.

== The Amazing Race ==
In 2010, Kellum appeared on season 17 of the television reality show The Amazing Race with his best friend Tony Stovall. Despite securing tickets on the first flight to London, they were the first team eliminated from the competition after becoming lost trying to find Stonehenge.

== Personal life ==
Kellum resides in Los Angeles.
