= Elvegården =

Village in Narvik Municipality, Norway

Elvegården Jogasiida (Northern Sami) Elvegård
- Village
- Interactive map of Elvegården
- Location within Nordland Location within Norway
- Coordinates: 68.2565°N 17.4025°E
- Country: Norway
- Region: Northern Norway
- County: Nordland
- District: Ofoten
- Municipality: Narvik Municipality
- Elevation: 10 m (33 ft)
- Time zone: UTC+01:00 (CET)
  - Summer (DST): UTC+02:00 (CEST)
- Post Code: 8523 Elvegård

Elvegården (Norwegian; Northern Sami: Jogasiida) is a village in Narvik Municipality in Nordland county, Norway. The village is located along the Skjomen fjord. Skjomen Church is located in the village on the shore of the fjord. There is a golf course in Elvegård, located along the river Elvegårdselva.
