= Vidrek =

Village in Narvik Municipality, Norway

Vidrek (Norwegian); Vierák (Northern Sami)
- Village
- Interactive map of: Vidrek (Norwegian); Vierák (Northern Sami)
- Location within Nordland Location within Norway
- Coordinates: 68.3905°N 17.1416°E
- Country: Norway
- Region: Northern Norway
- County: Nordland
- District: Ofoten
- Municipality: Narvik Municipality
- Elevation: 12 m (39 ft)
- Time zone: UTC+01:00 (CET)
  - Summer (DST): UTC+02:00 (CEST)
- Post Code: 8520 Ankenesstrand

Vidrek (Norwegian) or Vierák (Northern Sami) is a small village in Narvik Municipality in Nordland county, Norway. The village is located along the Ofotfjorden, just east of the Skjomen fjord. The population of the village is about 70.

On 10 April 1940, in the First Naval Battle of Narvik, the British flagship HMS Hardy was beached in flames on Vidrek, and about 30 seamen were killed.
