= Skjomen Church =

Church in Nordland, Norway

- Skjomen kirke
- Skjomen Church
- 68.2553802°N 17.4007558°E
- Location: Narvik Municipality, Nordland
- Country: Norway
- Denomination: Church of Norway
- Churchmanship: Evangelical Lutheran

History
- Status: Parish church
- Founded: 1893
- Consecrated: 17 July 1893

Architecture
- Functional status: Active
- Architect: Ole Scheistrøen
- Architectural type: Long church
- Completed: 1893 (133 years ago)

Specifications
- Capacity: 240
- Materials: Wood

Administration
- Diocese: Sør-Hålogaland
- Deanery: Ofoten prosti
- Parish: Skjomen
- Norwegian Cultural Heritage Site
- Type: Church
- Status: Not protected
- ID: 85466

Skjomen Church (Norwegian: Skjomen kirke) is a parish church of the Church of Norway in Narvik Municipality in Nordland county, Norway. It is located in the village of Elvegård. It is the church for the Skjomen parish which is part of the Ofoten prosti (deanery) in the Diocese of Sør-Hålogaland. The white, wooden church was built in a long church style in 1893 using plans drawn up by the architect Ole Scheistrøen. The church seats about 240 people. The building was consecrated on 17 July 1893.

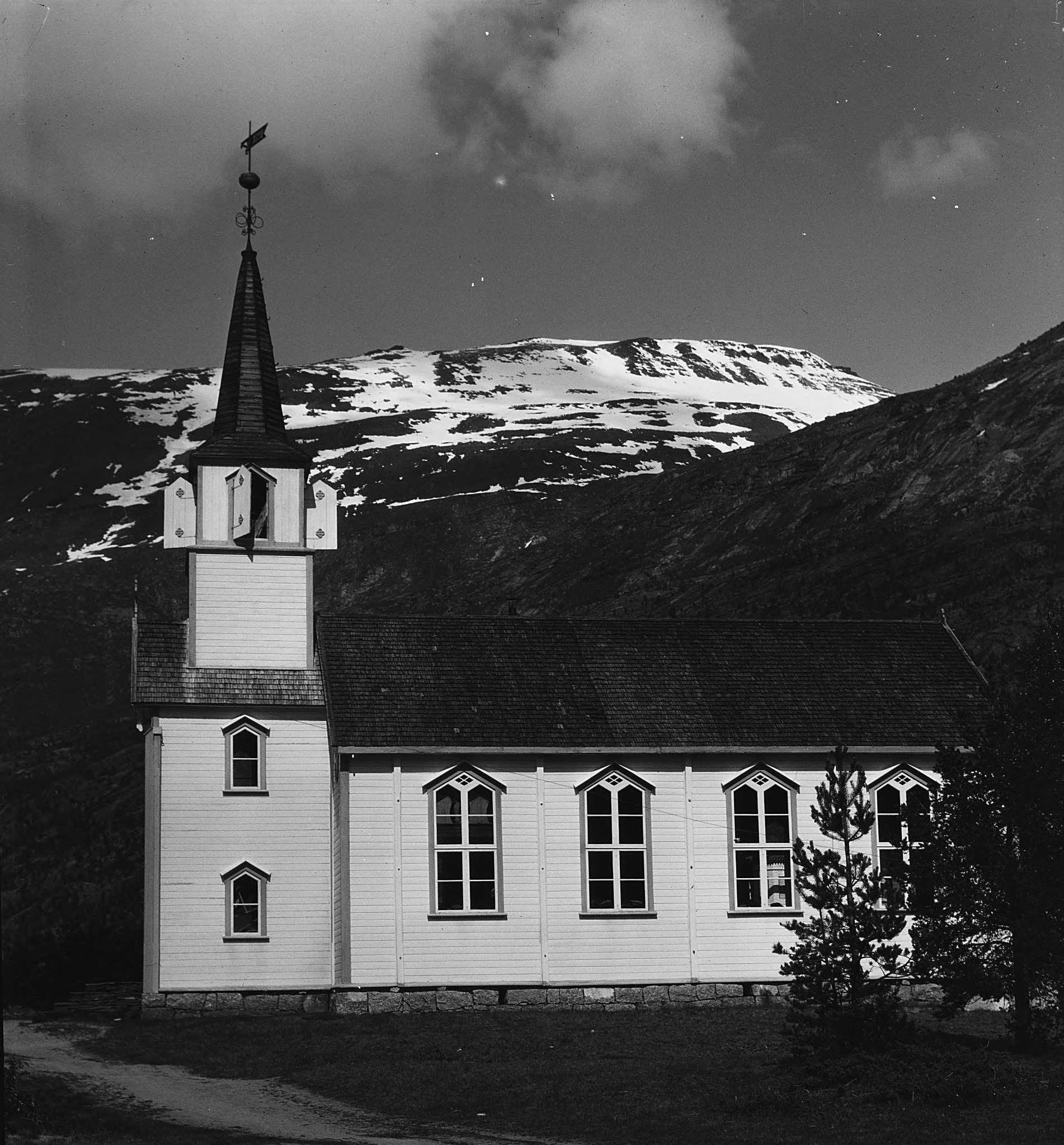
Skjomen Church

== See also ==
- List of churches in Sør-Hålogaland
