= Tikin Xic =

Mexican style of fish preparation from the Yucatan

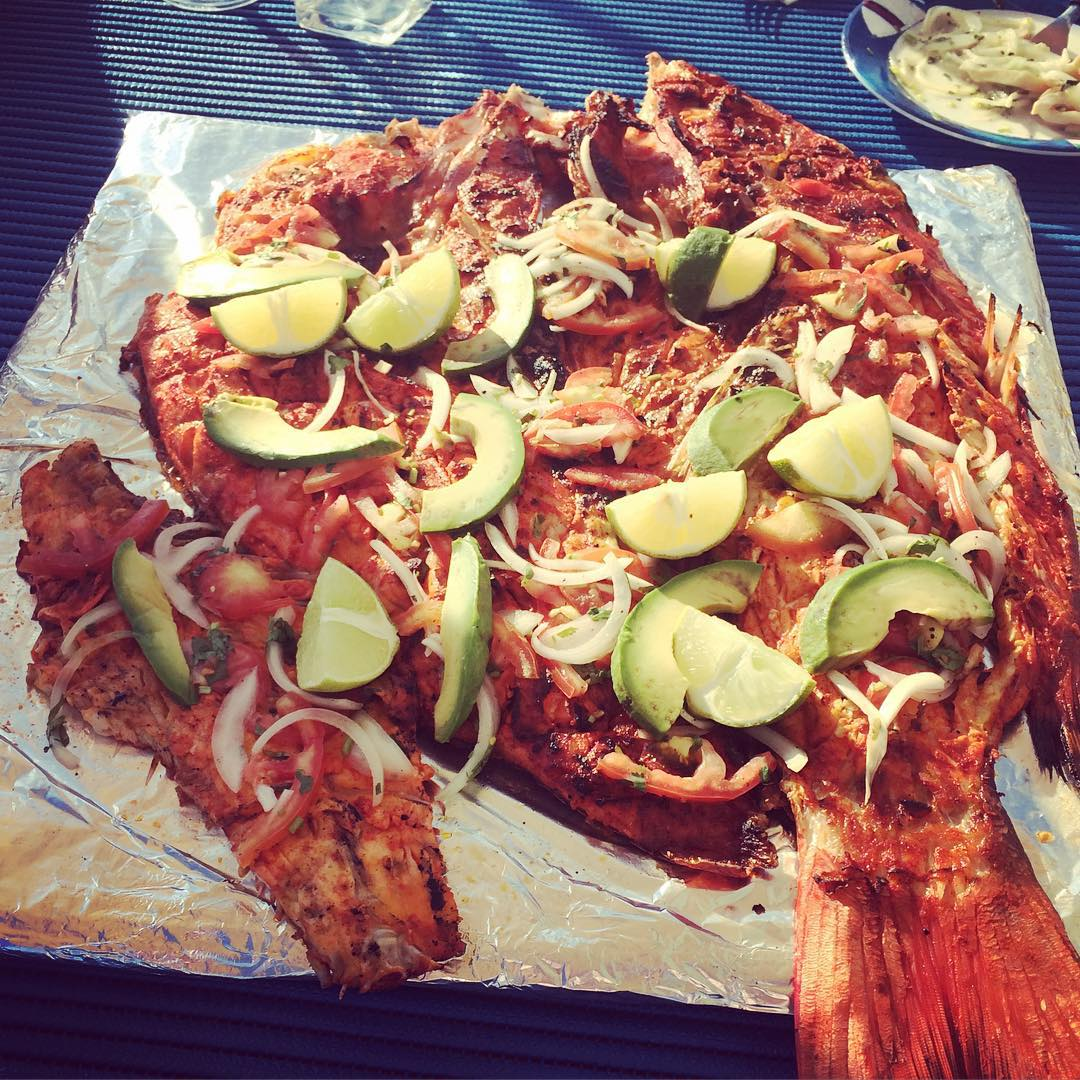
Tikin Xic fish

Tikin Xic is a fish dish prepared in the Yucatan style. In Yucatec Mayan (pronounced "teekeen sheek") it means "dry fin", referring to the way the fish is prepared in a butterfly cut.

The fish is prepared whole then marinated with adobo de achiote and sour oranges then wrapped in a banana leaf and cooked in an earth oven beneath a wood fire.

== Preparation ==
The dish is prepared with a firm white fish, usually grouper or red snapper.

== Modernization ==
Modern cooking methods have simplified the preparation at the risk of changing it. The banana leaf is usually steamed instead of buried for cooking. In some cases the fish is prepared ahead of time and served with an achiote sauce.
