= Kaneshie =

- Town
- Location within Ghana
- Coordinates: 5°33′24″N 00°13′29″W
- Country: Ghana
- Region: Greater Accra Region
- District: Accra Metropolitan
- Time zone: GMT
  - Summer (DST): GMT

Kaneshie is a suburb in the Accra Metropolitan district, a district of the Greater Accra Region of Ghana. The name was derived from a word in the Ga-Adangbe, that is "Kane Shie Shie", meaning "under the lamp" referring to its beginnings as a night market.

== Education ==
Kaneshie is known for the Kaneshie Secondary Technical School. The school is a second cycle institution. Other Educational establishments in and around Kaneshie include;

- Accra Academy
- Grace Prep. School
- St. Theresa Catholic School
- KA Awudome Cluster of Schools
- Prince of Peace International School
- Rev. J.T Clegg Mem. Methodist School
- Winston-Salem Prep. Sch.
- Starward Prep. Sch.
- Jahrock Prep. Sch.

== Healthcare ==
- The Eden Family Hospital is located in Kaneshie
- Cocoa Clinic
- Holy Trinity Hospital
- Kaneshie Polyclinic
- Lighthouse Medical Mission Hospital and Fertility Centre
- Greenhand Hospital

== Notable places ==
- Kaneshie market
- Azumah Nelson Sports Complex
- Awudome Cemetery
- Zoozoo Restaurant
- Ga Mantse (Chief) Palace
- The Qodesh (Lighthouse Chapel)
- St. Theresa Catholic Church
- Rev. Joseph Thomas Clegg Mem. Methodist Church
- Accra Academy
- Accra Wesley Girls High School
- Kaneshie Senior High School
- Honest Cheff
- Papaye Restaurant
- Cocoa Clinic
- Greenhand Hospital
- Solid Rock Chapel International
