= Skjomen =

Fjord in Nordland, Norway

- Skievvá (Northern Sami)
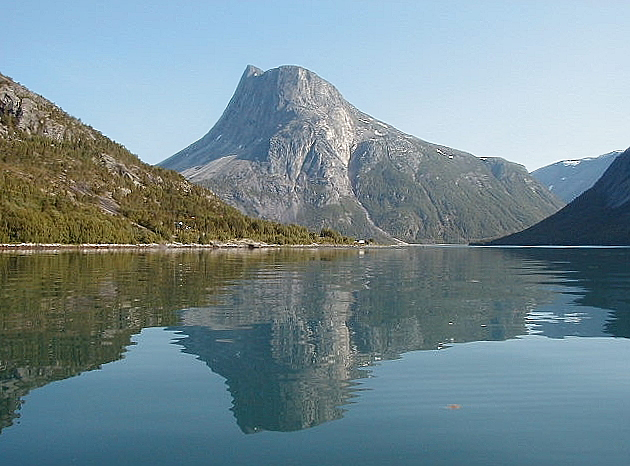
- View of the southern part of Skjomen with Lappviktind in the background
- Interactive map of the fjord
- Location: Nordland county, Norway
- Coordinates: 68.3039°N 17.2912°E
- Type: Fjord
- Basin countries: Norway
- Max. length: 25 kilometres (16 mi)
- Max. width: 2.5 kilometres (1.6 mi)
- Settlements: Elvegård

Skjomen (Northern Sami: Skievvá) is a small fjord that branches off from the main Ofotfjorden in Narvik Municipality in Nordland county, Norway. It is located in the Ofoten district in Northern Norway, just south of the town of Narvik. The European route E6 highway crosses the Skjomen fjord over the Skjomen Bridge, just south of the mouth of the fjord.

Klubbviktind to the right and Reintind to the left

The rock carvings in Skjomen on the south side of the fjord placed at the foothill of Reintind

== Skjomdalen ==
A sheltered valley called "Skjomdalen" extends southward from the end of the fjord. The valley is inhabited by approximately 400 people. The population is spread out over several very small villages in the valley, with the largest being Elvegård which functions as a very small service centre for the valley. One of the world's northernmost 18 hole golf courses is located in Elvegård, near the fjord. Skjomen Church sits along the shore of the fjord in Elvegård.

== Name ==
The name "Skjomen" was originally called Skieffa or Skievva in the 15th century. This is a name from the Northern Sami language that is believed to mean "Sea". The Sami people are a nomadic people living among others in the mountains of Sweden and Norway in the wintertime and traveling to the sea at springtime. In this case traveling to Skieffa (sea) or Skjomen.

== History ==
Skjomen has a site of about 80 rock carvings near the sea. They consist of animal figures, including reindeer, whales and moose, as well as a human figure holding a reindeer in straps. The rock carvings are believed to have been made by the Mesolithic Fosna-Hensbacka culture dating from around 5000 BC. The rock carvings were discovered in the 1930s.

For a short period, the German battleship Tirpitz hid beneath the extremely steep mountains surrounding the fjord to avoid attack by Allied warplanes during World War II.

== Geography ==
Skjomen is known for its scenic landscape with high, steep mountains and clear water. Skjomtind, Reintind, and Klubbviktind are three of the many beautiful mountains surrounding the fjord. The highest point around Skjomen is the 1,894-metre (6,214 ft) tall mountain Storsteinfjell. The Frostisen glacier, which is one of the larger plateau glaciers in Norway, is located just west of the fjord. Frostisen covers an area of about 25 square kilometres (9.7 sq mi) and is located at an elevation of 1,710 to 840 metres (5,610 to 2,760 ft) above sea level.

Panorama of the Skjomen fjord

== See also ==
- List of Norwegian fjords
