= Kaneshie market =

Coordinates: 5.566476°N 0.236579°W

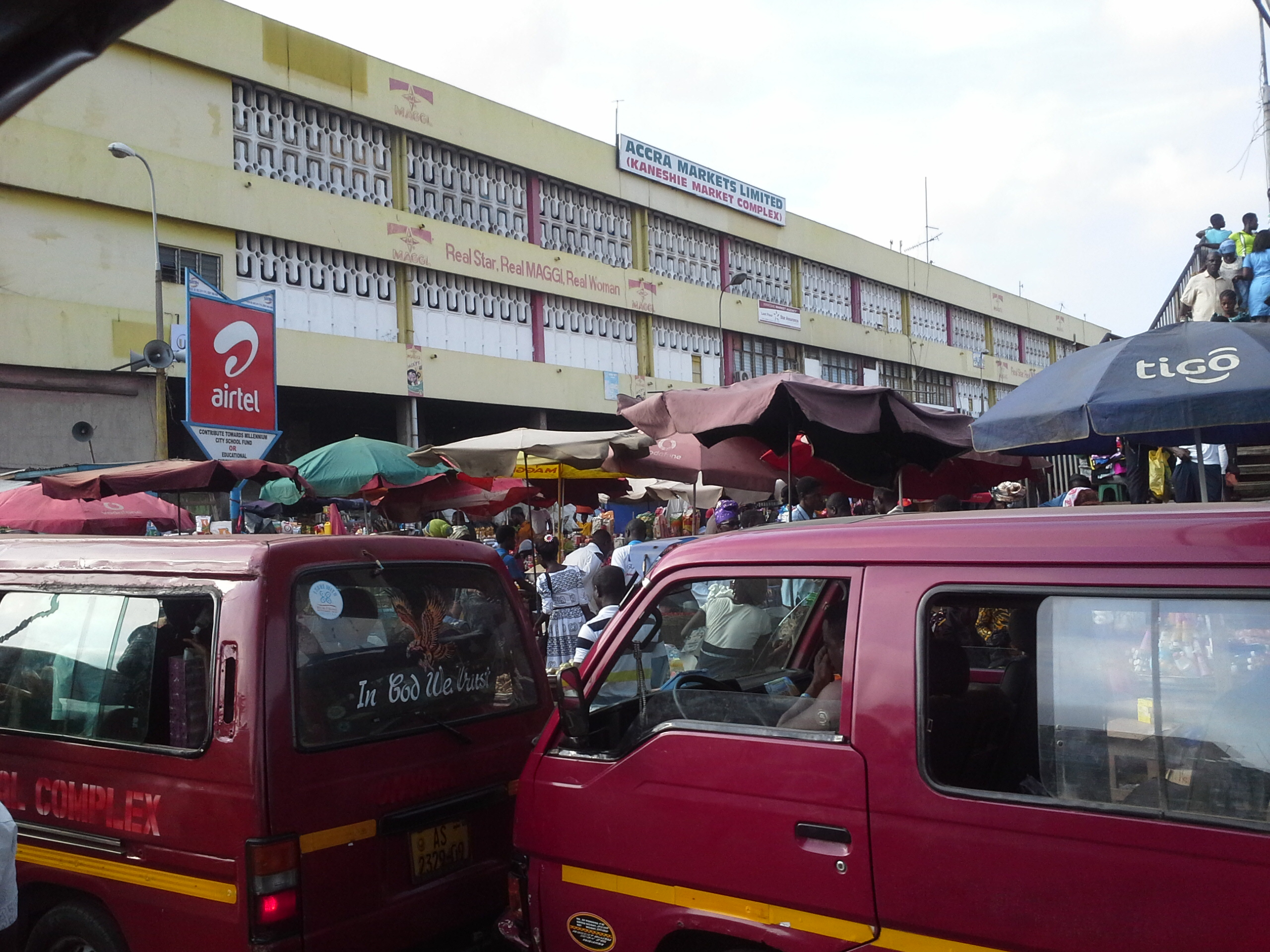
A section of the Kaneshie market complex (Sep 2014)

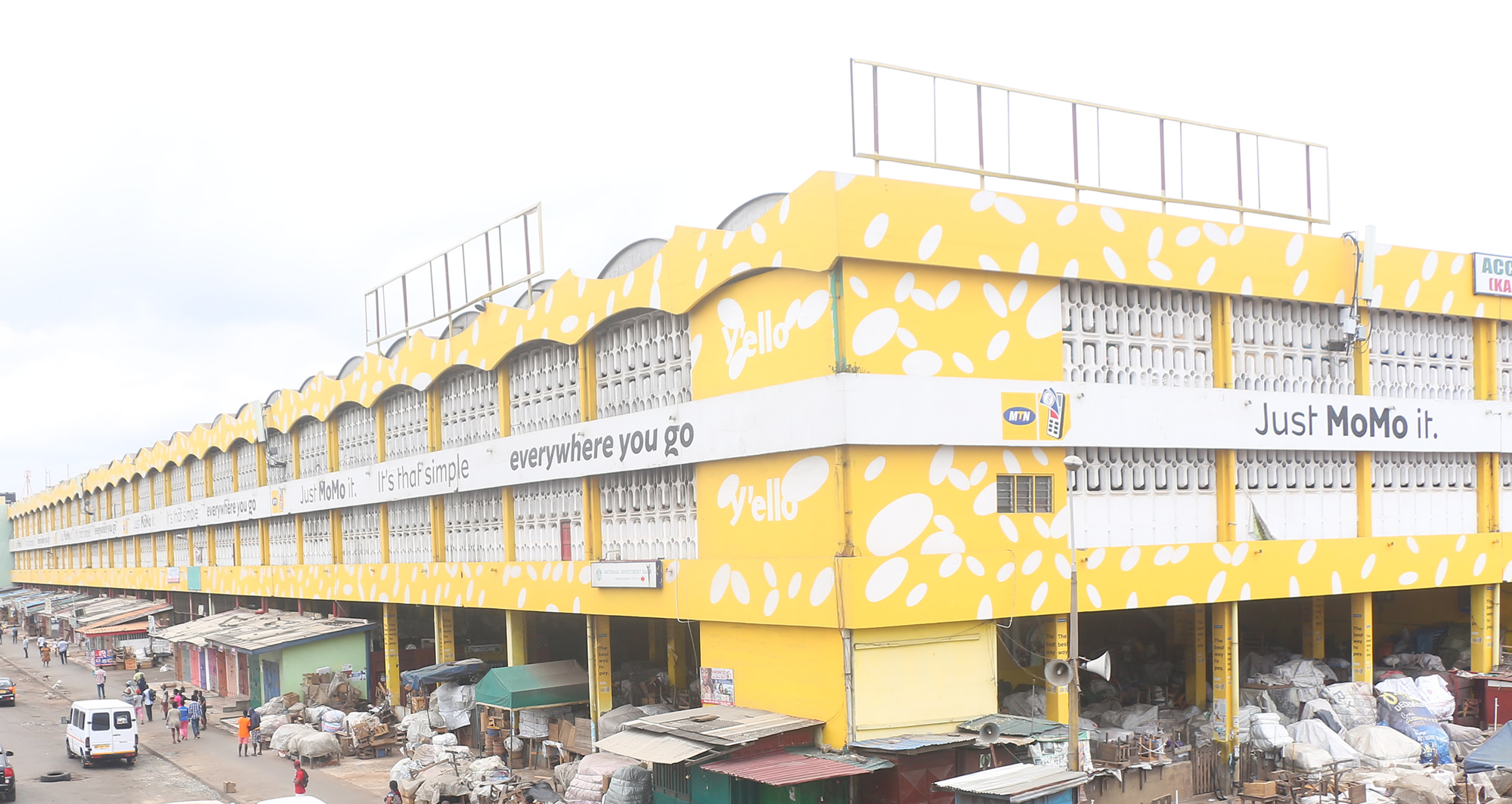
Kaneshie Markets Limited

The Kaneshi Markets Limited is a trading Centre in Kaneshie, Accra, Ghana. It was built in the 1970s. The name "Kaneshie" means "under the lamp" referring to its beginnings as a night market. During the 2015 Accra floods, the market was submerged and operations were forced to shut down.

Kaneshie Market is located along the main road heading west from Accra. It resembles Makola Market in many ways, with a bustling mix of stalls, shops, and street vendors selling almost anything you can think of. The market also serves as a key transportation point, where "trotros" and regional buses pick up and drop off passengers. That said, if you're visiting a market just for the experience, Makola is easier to reach.

Kaneshie also has services and dealers associated with vehicles and transport, as well as more formal fuel stations, supermarkets, pharmacies and other formal shops.

== Sanitation ==
In 2018, The Kaneshie market was on the verge of collapse due to poor sanitation as a result of improper management of garbage. Mad. Lydia Akor Akwei, the market queen of Kaneshie market also explained that the market had become a dumping site for the surrounding communities because the city authorities had failed to provide those communities with proper garbage disposal systems.

Various non-governmental organizations have engaged in comprehensive clean-ups and Fumigation exercises at the Kaneshie Market to fulfill their Corporate Social Responsibility. This initiative was created to by Pan-African Savings and Loans, in partnership with Zoomlion Ghana Limited to ensure a cleaner and healthier environment for traders and customers.

== Disasters ==
The Kaneshie market has been prone to fire outbreaks. The former Mayor of Accra, Mohammed Nii Adjei Sowah undertook a rewiring exercise of markets in Accra including the Kaneshie market after a fire out break on the 20th of December 2020 at the Kaneshie Market. The fire which started during the early hours of Sunday 20 December, 2020 destroyed a section of the Kaneshie Central Market.
