= Lødingen =

Lødingen may refer to:

== Places ==
- Lødingen Municipality, a municipality in Nordland county, Norway
- Lødingen (village), a coastal fishing village within Lødingen Municipality in Nordland county, Norway
- Lødingen Church, a church in Lødingen Municipality in Nordland county, Norway

== Other ==
- Lødingen IL, a sports club based in Lødingen Municipality in Nordland county, Norway
- Lødingen Lighthouse, a coastal lighthouse in Lødingen Municipality in Nordland county, Norway
