= Kaare Espolin Johnson =

Norwegian illustrator and painter (1907–1994)

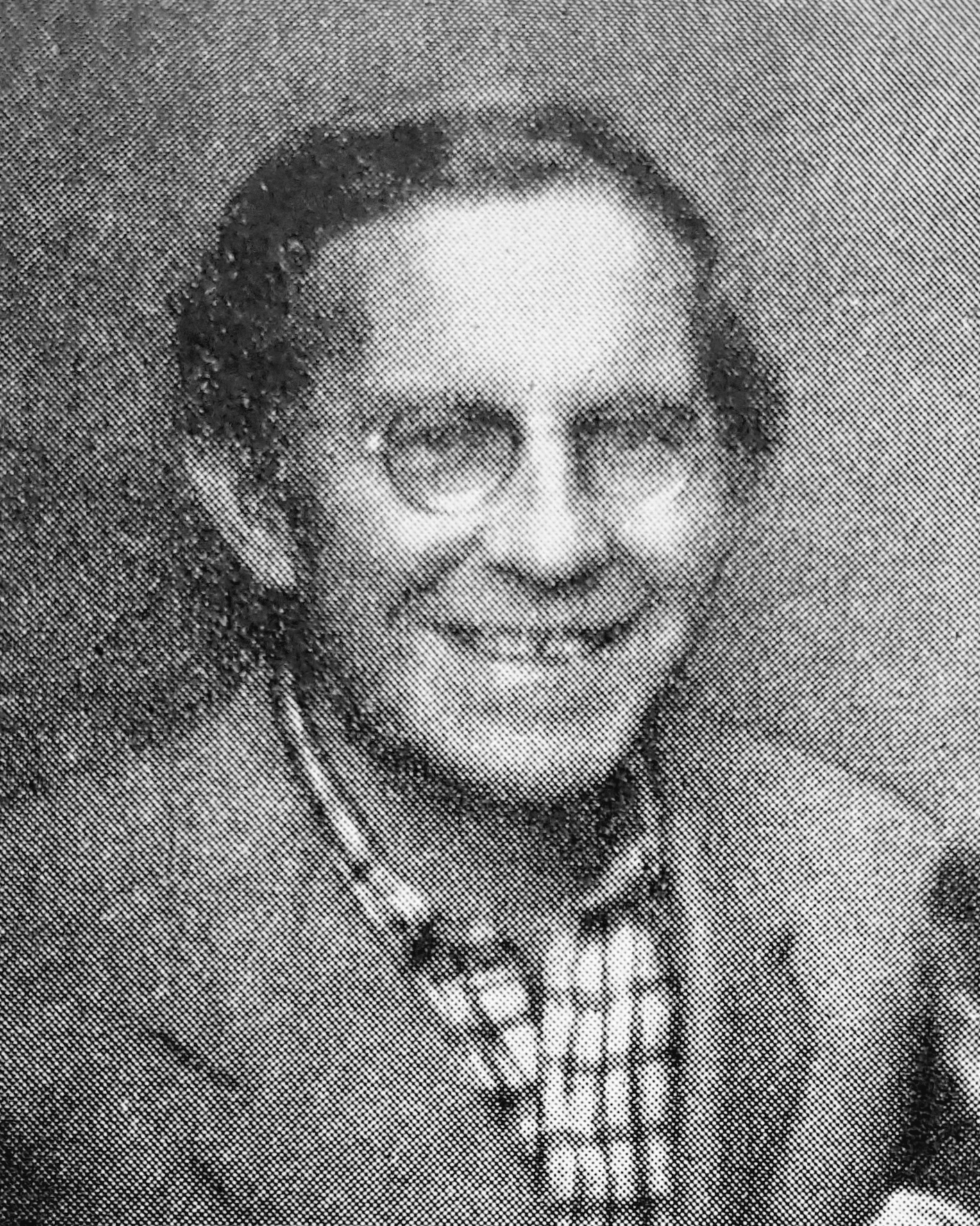
- Norwegian artist and illustrator
- Born: March 7, 1907; Surnadal, Norway
- Died: August 16, 1994 (aged 87); Ljan, Norway
- Occupation: Artist

Kaare Espolin Johnson (March 7, 1907 – August 16, 1994) was a Norwegian artist and illustrator.

== Life and work ==
Espolin Johnson was born at the Vasseng farm in Surnadal Municipality. In 1909, when he was two years old, his family moved to the town of Vadsø, and then moved again to the town of Bodø in 1919. In 1927, after spending some time in the town of Horten, Espolin Johnson relocated to Oslo, where he studied at the Norwegian National Academy of Craft and Art Industry and Norwegian National Academy of Fine Arts under Axel Revold and Halfdan Strøm. There he developed a special layering and scraping technique using soot early on in almost exclusively black and white. He had poor eyesight, and this technique was very well suited for his limited vision.

He debuted at the Autumn Exhibition in 1932 and soon started contributing illustrations to the magazine Arbeidermagasinet. Espolin Johnson also illustrated many books, among which the first was Vett og uvett. Stubber fra Troms og Nordland (Sense and Nonsense: Short Stories from Troms and Nordland, 1942) by Einar Kristoffer Aas and Peter Wessel Zapffe. His motifs were based on northern Norwegian fishing life, and continued with motives from rural life to the south. Examples of this include his illustrations for Sigbjørn Hølmebakk's Fimbulvinter (The Great Winter, 1964), Regine Normann's Ringelihorn og andre eventyr (Ringelihorn and Other Tales, 1967), and Johan Bojer's Den siste viking (The Last Viking, 1972).

Espolin Johnson also decorated the Coastal Express vessel MS Harald Jarl (1960) with several motifs from Petter Dass's Nordlands Trompet. These paintings were transferred to the new Coastal Express vessel MS Trollfjord when MS Harald Jarl was sold. In addition, he decorated the Kirkenes police station (in 1964), the county hospital in Ålesund (in 1973), and the telegraph station in Sandnessjøen (in 1975).

In an interview with NRK TV in connection with the opening of the Espolin Gallery in 1992, Espolin Johnson stated that, when he looked back at his artistic work, it was the illustrations for Vett og Uvett and Bojer's Den siste viking that gave him the most pleasure. He highlighted the Baroque humor in Vett og Uvett as one of the reasons why he had enjoyed that task in particular.

Espolin Johnson received the Nordland County Culture Prize in 1990. He is represented in Norway's National Museum of Art, Architecture and Design by 39 of his artworks.

== Literature ==
A biography of Espolin Johnson was written by Arne Durban in 1979. In 1994, together with Arthur Arntzen, Espolin Johnson coauthored the book Og langsomt kom lyset (And Slowly Came the Light), which discusses Northern Norway and its art, with 22 of his own works in focus.

To mark the centenary of the birth of Espolin Johnson, in 2007 Pax Forlag issued a new and expanded edition of Bjørn Tore Pedersen's volume Kaare Espolin Johnson – Lengselens billeddikter (Kaare Espolin Johnson: The Visual Poet of Longing).

== Espolin Gallery ==
The Espolin Gallery (Norwegian: Galleri Espolin) was established in 1992 in Kabelvåg in Vågan Municipality, which received 40 to 50 of Espolin Johnson's works in 1983. The collection contains nearly 170 works.

== Illustrations by Espolin Johnson ==
=== Books illustrated ===
- Einar K. Aas and Peter Wessel Zapffe: Vett og uvett. 1942 (plus various new editions)
- Henrik Wergeland: Vesle-Hans. 1945
- Hans Henrik Holm: Vårhelg i Gaukleikleiv. 1947 (with Tore Deinboll)
- Hans Henrik Holm: Fugl Føniks i eplehagen. 1948 (with Tore Deinboll)
- Øivind Bolstad: Spøkefuglen på Toska. 1955
- Sigbjørn Hølmebakk: Fimbulvinteren. 1964
- Olav Nordrå: Herr Petters trompet. 1964
- Olav Nordrå: Jeg hilser jorden. 1965
- Regine Normann: Ringelihorn og andre eventyr. 1967
- Ole Barman: Draumen og andre noveller. 1968
- Den fyrste song. Antologi over norske voggesongar. 1968
- Hans Johan Bjørnstad: Av lofotfiskerens saga. 1970
- Roar Petersen: Sånn kan det gå. 1970
- Johan Bojer: Den siste viking. 1972
- Hans Johan Bjørnstad: Jeg kjente et land. 1976
- Ut mot hav. Nordland fylkes fiskarlag. 1977
- Før oss 1. Noveller fra eldre barnelitteratur, with Sonja Hagemann. 1977
- Arne Durban: Kaare Espolin Johnson. 1979
- Hans Johan Bjørnstad: ... men kirkesangeren var pennefør. 1979
- Før og nå. Nynorsk litteratur fra Sivle til Sagen. 1980
- Peter Christen Asbjørnsen and Jørgen Moe: Det var en gang… 1981
- Lofotboka. 1982
- I storm og stilla. Nordland fylkes fiskarlag. 1982
- Barnas beste: i gamle dager. 1983
- Skolp: årbok for Vågan. 1984
- Ord for andre: antologi til inntekt for de sultrammede i Etiopia. 1985
- Reidar Hirsti: Grenseløse mennesker. 1987
- Pomorhandelen. Einar Niemi (ed.) 1992
- Årbok for Vågan. 1995
- Kaare Espolin Johnson: Grafikk. 1997
- Kaare Espolin Johnson and Arthur Arntzen: Og langsomt kom lyset. 1994
- Kaare Espolin Johnson: Skisser og forelskelser. 2002
- Bjørn Tore Pedersen: Lengselens billeddikter. 2000
- Linda Lillevik: Eventyrlige Espolin: glimt fra et kunstnerliv. 2007
- Å låne øyne å se med. Aaslaug Vaa (ed.). 2007
- Vær hilset: Espolin i 100 år. Wenche Thorunn Nilsen. (ed.). 2007

=== Cover illustrations ===
- Andreas Haukland: Landeveiens folk. 1933
- Helge Holst: Huset på grensen. 1933
- Franz Kafka: Prosessen. 1934
- Gisken Wildenway: Andrine og Kjell. 1934
- Øivind Bolstad: De gyldne lenker. 1934
- Sven Nilsen: Et menneske kommer til verden. 1934
- John Dos Passos: Cirkus Verdensteater. 1934
- Nils Johan Rud: Så stjeler vi et fattighus. 1934
- Herman Lundsrud: Vi som ikke er mennesker. 1935
- Bjørn Rongen: Nettenes natt. 1940
- Leif Ytteren: Trollfjell. 1944
- Stephen Wendt: Min elskede, husker du? 1951
- Seymour Shubin: Fienden i meg selv. 1955
- Emil Boysen: Gjenkjennelse. 1957
- Norge i nord. Den norske turistforening. 1963
- Olav Nordrå: Guds ulver. 1967
- Alf Larsen: Siste strofer. 1969
- Johan Bojer: Folk ved sjøen. 1977
- Johan Bojer: Vår egen stamme. 1977
- Per Fugelli: Bruk av legemidler på Værøy og Røst. 1978
- Lofotboka. 1979
- Arvid Hanssen: Søsken på Guds jord. 1981
- Arvid Møller: Losen på Tranøy. 1983
- Randi Folkestad: Tangsforretningen. 1985
- Liv Marie Austrem: Gyda. 1995
- Lars Hermansen: Exercise in Human Physiology. 1986
- Olav H. Hauge: Trust Your Life to Water and Eternity. 1987
- Kjell Sandvik: Sang til Finnmark. 1989.
- Environmental Consequences of Deep Seabed Mining. 1991
- Challenges of a Changing World. 1991
- Proceedings from the Northern Sea Route Expert Meeting. 1992
- Tore Skoglund: Draugen, hevneren fra havet. 1992
- Per Fugelli: Doktor på Værøy og Røst; Lege på Utrøst. 2006
