= Deinboll =

Deinboll is a surname. Notable people with the surname include:

- Peter Deinboll (1915–1944), Norwegian engineer and resistance member
- Rikka Deinboll (1897–1973), Norwegian librarian and translator
- Tore Deinboll (1910–1988), Norwegian artist, cartoonist, and illustrator, stepson of Rikka
