= Hammarström =

Hammarström is a Swedish surname. Notable people with the surname include:

- Hanna Hammarström (1829–1909), Swedish inventor and businesswoman
- Harald Hammarström (born 1977), Swedish linguist
- Inge Hammarström (born 1948), Swedish ice hockey player
- Klara Hammarström (born 2000), Swedish singer
- Kristin Hammarström (born 1982), Swedish footballer
- Louise Hammarström (1849–1917), Swedish chemist
- Marie Hammarström (born 1982), Swedish footballer
- Nanny Hammarström (1870–1953), Finnish author
- Peter Hammarström (born 1969), Swedish ice hockey player
- Rune Hammarström (1920–1999), Swedish speed skater
- Torsten Hammarström (1896–1965), Swedish diplomat
