= Rotvær Lighthouse =

Coastal lighthouse in Lødingen, Norway

Rotvær Lighthouse Rotvær fyrstasjon
- Location: Fugløya island, Lødingen, Nordland, Norway
- Coordinates: 68°22′04″N 15°56′40″E

Tower
- Constructed: 1914
- Construction: Fiberglass
- Automated: 1985
- Height: 13 m (43 ft)
- Shape: Cylindrical
- Markings: White with black stripes, red top

Light
- First lit: 1985
- Focal height: 22 m (72 ft)
- Intensity: 25,400 candela
- Range: Red: 10.2 nmi (18.9 km; 11.7 mi) Green: 9.7 nmi (18.0 km; 11.2 mi) White: 12.8 nmi (23.7 km; 14.7 mi)
- Characteristic: Oc WRG 6s
- Norway no.: 734500

Rotvær Lighthouse (Norwegian: Rotvær fyr) is a coastal lighthouse in Lødingen Municipality in Nordland county, Norway. The lighthouse sits at the east end of the island of Fugløya, part of dangerous reef at the entrance to the Ofotfjorden, about 6 kilometres (3.7 mi) south of the village of Lødingen.

== History ==
The 12-metre (39 ft) tall lighthouse was first lit in 1914. In 1985, the old lighthouse was closed and a new automated, electric fiberglass light was installed near the old tower. The light sits at an elevation of 21.5 metres (71 ft) above sea level. The 25,400-candela light is white, red, or green light depending on the viewing direction and it is occulting once every 6 seconds. The light can be seen for up to 12.8 nautical miles (23.7 km; 14.7 mi).

== See also ==
- Lighthouses in Norway
- List of lighthouses in Norway
