= Våge, Nordland =

Våge (Norwegian); Voagak (Northern Sami); Vågehamn (historic)
- Village
- Interactive map of: Våge (Norwegian); Voagak (Northern Sami)
- Location within Nordland Location within Norway
- Coordinates: 68.3473°N 15.5102°E
- Country: Norway
- Region: Northern Norway
- County: Nordland
- District: Ofoten
- Municipality: Lødingen Municipality
- Elevation: 13 m (43 ft)
- Time zone: UTC+01:00 (CET)
  - Summer (DST): UTC+02:00 (CEST)
- Post Code: 8412 Vestbygd

Våge (Norwegian) or Voagak (Northern Sami) (or historically Vågehamn) is a village in Lødingen Municipality in Nordland county, Norway. The village is located in the Vestbygd area on the southern shore of the island of Hinnøya along the inner part of the Vestfjorden. It is located about 50 kilometres (31 mi) by car southwest of the main village of Lødingen. The villages of Ytterstad and Offersøya are both located about 10 kilometres (6.2 mi) to the southeast.

Våge is the commercial centre of the western part of Lødingen Municipality, known as Vestbygd. The village is the site of Vestbygd Church along with a school, day care, swimming pool, library, sports facilities, care home for the elderly, community center, small harbor, home improvement workshop, cheese factory, hardware store, and convenience store.
