= Dagfinn Bakke =

Norwegian painter, illustrator and printmaker (1933–2019)

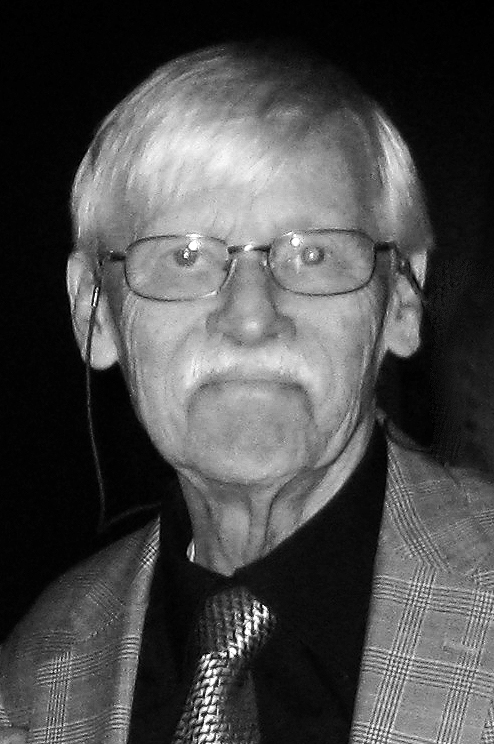
- Born: 16 August 1933; Lødingen, Norway
- Died: 1 January 2019 (aged 85); Svolvær
- Occupations: Illustrator, printmaker and painter
- Employer: Lofotposten

Dagfinn Bakke (16 August 1933 – 1 January 2019) was a Norwegian painter, illustrator and printmaker.

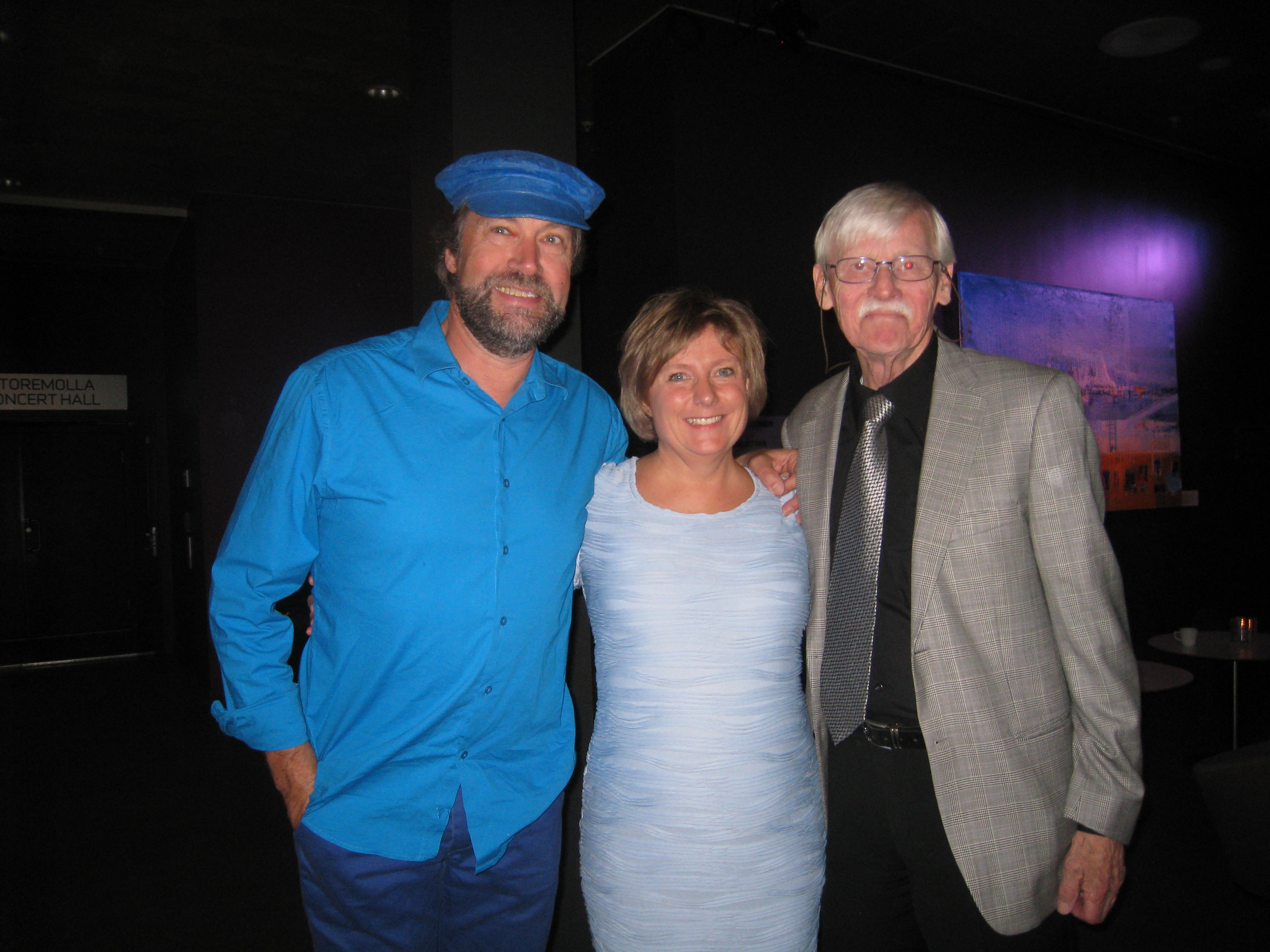
Ola Bremnes, Linda Lillevik and Dagfinn Bakke (right) in 2014.

== Career ==
Bakke was born in Lødingen Municipality, and settled in Svolvær. From 1952 he worked as illustrator for the magazine Magasinet For Alle. From 1956 to 1992 he was appointed as illustrator for the newspaper Lofotposten, where he had a regular column which he signed as DAN. He illustrated several books, and is represented at the National Gallery of Norway and other art galleries.

His book illustrations include several humorous books by Arthur Arntzen.

In 2013, Bjørn Tore Pedersen wrote a biography about Bakke.

== Awards ==
In 1983, his caricature of Margaret Thatcher, pictured as a besom-riding witch escorted home from the Falkland Islands by British aircraft, won first prize at the International Salon of Cartoons in Montreal.

He was awarded the Petter Dass medal in 2015.
