= Vestbygd Church =

Church in Nordland, Norway

- Vestbygd kirke
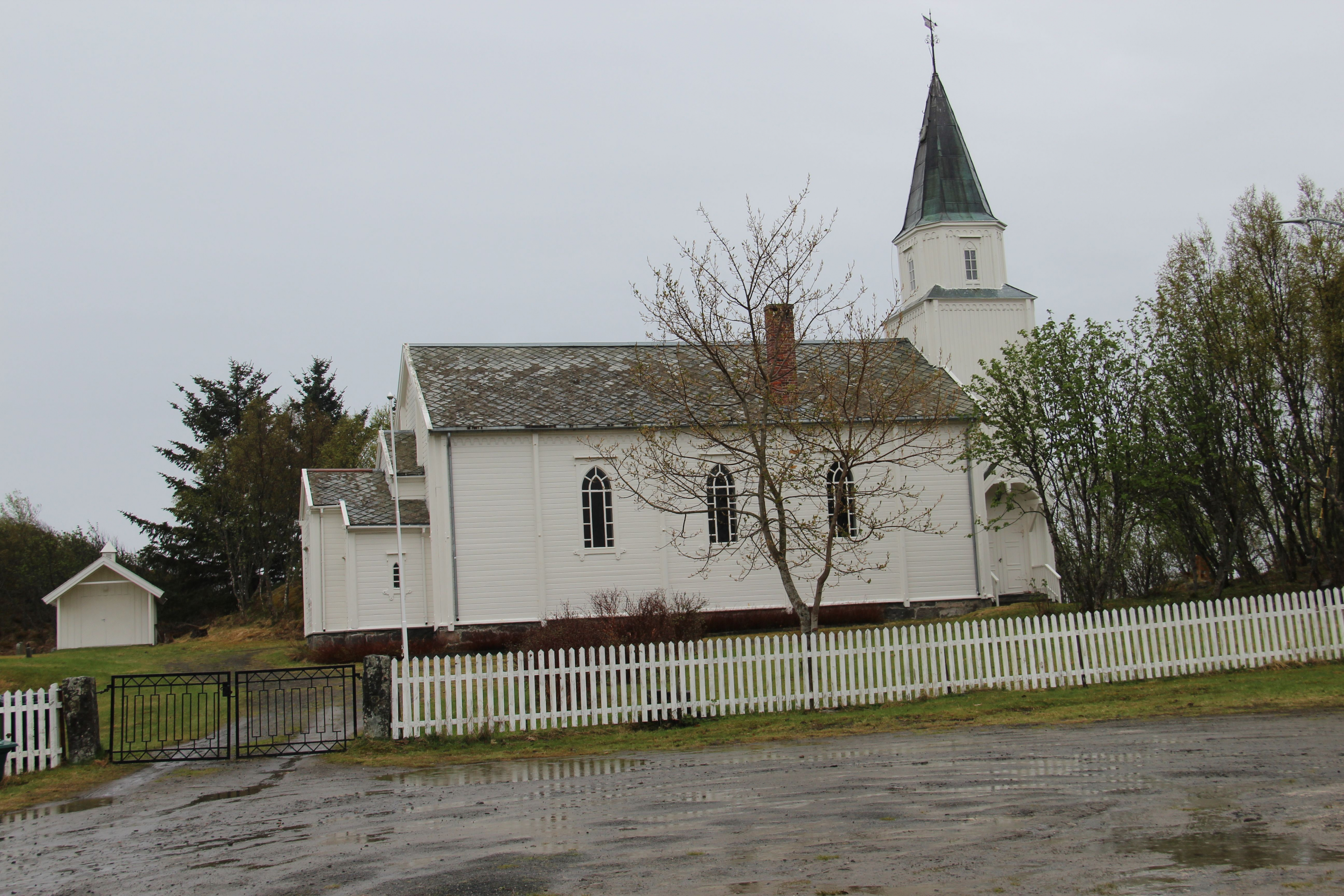
- View of the church
- Vestbygd Church
- 68.34405301°N 15.50356775°E
- Location: Lødingen Municipality, Nordland
- Country: Norway
- Denomination: Church of Norway
- Churchmanship: Evangelical Lutheran

History
- Status: Parish church
- Founded: 1885
- Consecrated: 1885

Architecture
- Functional status: Active
- Architect: Johannes Henrik Nissen
- Architectural type: Long church
- Completed: 1885 (141 years ago)

Specifications
- Capacity: 230
- Materials: Wood

Administration
- Diocese: Sør-Hålogaland
- Deanery: Vesterålen prosti
- Parish: Lødingen
- Norwegian Cultural Heritage Site
- Type: Church
- Status: Listed
- ID: 85809

Vestbygd Church (Norwegian: Vestbygd kirke) is a parish church of the Church of Norway in Lødingen Municipality in Nordland county, Norway. It is located in the village of Vågehamn. It is one of the two churches for the Lødingen parish which is part of the Vesterålen prosti (deanery) in the Diocese of Sør-Hålogaland. The white, wooden church was built in a long church style in 1885 using plans drawn up by the architect Johannes Henrik Nissen. The church seats about 230 people. The church holds worship services one Sunday each month (services are held at the nearby Lødingen Church on the other Sundays).

On 1 January 2020, the churches in Lødingen Municipality were transferred from the Ofoten prosti to the Vesterålen prosti.

== See also ==
- List of churches in Sør-Hålogaland
