= Arthur Arntzen (writer) =

Norwegian writer, humorist and actor (1937–2025)

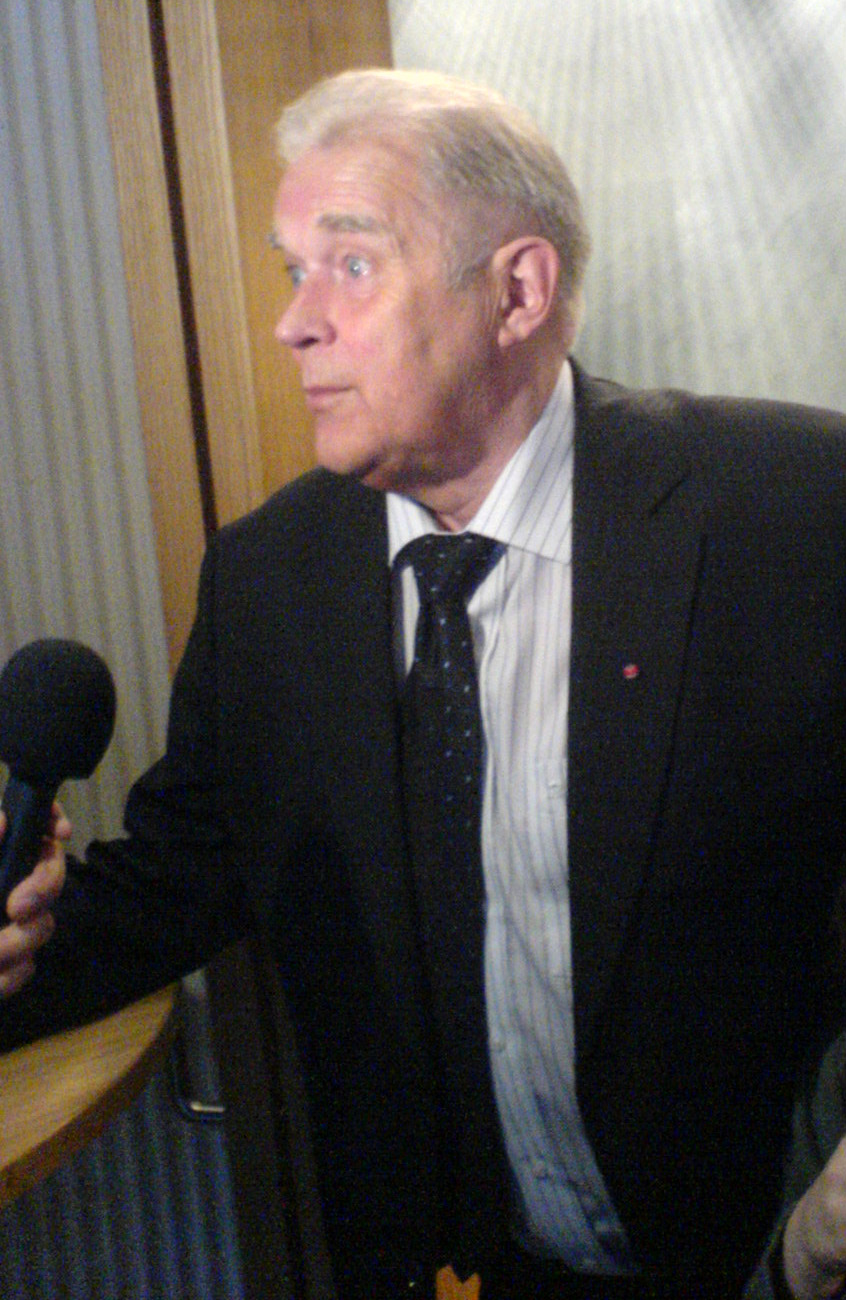
- Arntzen in 2007
- Born: Arthur Andreas Arntzen; 10 May 1937; Tromsø, Norway
- Died: 19 December 2025 (aged 88); Tromsø, Norway
- Occupation: Writer
- Years active: 1960–2025
- Known for: Oluf Rallkattli

Arthur Andreas Arntzen (10 May 1937 – 19 December 2025) was a Norwegian journalist, humorist, actor and writer. He wrote several humorous books, and is particularly known as the stage character "Oluf Rallkattli". His awards include Spellemannprisen, the Leonard Statuette, and the Order of St. Olav.

== Personal life ==
Arntzen was born in Tromsø on 10 May 1937. His parents were mine worker Petter Berg Arntzen and Olga Marie Moshaug. He was married to Randi Bangsund.

== Career ==
Arntzen worked as a journalist from 1960, first for the newspaper Bladet Tromsø, then for Lofotposten (Tromsø office) from 1964 to 1968, and finally for the Tromsø office of Dagbladet from 1968 to 1989.

Arntzen is particularly known as "Oluf Rallkattli", a character he used for more than 50 years. In his teens, he frequented the cultural youth society Freidig in Tromsdalen, where the family lived at the time. Here, he started entertaining, playing the character "Oluf" in stage performances. He continued with these performances also after he had started working as a journalist. Arntzen was discovered by Håkon Karlsen, and Karlsen and Arntzen collaborated touring with stage performances between 1964 and 1979. From the 1980s, Arntzen regularly collaborated with Tore Skoglund on stage. Asle Myrvoll was also a regular collaborator, playing the character "Lars", son of Oluf.

He made his literary debut in 1967 with the humorous book Han Oluf. Further humor books, illustrated by Dagfinn Bakke, are Ho Emma (1968), Han Lars (1970), Rallkattlia (1973), Oluf R (1974), Super-Oluf (1976), Rapport fra Rallkattlia (1980), Den siste Oluf (1983), and Nye Oluf from 1987. Another book series with humorous short stories consists of the books Æ lyg ikkje from 1986, Æ sei ikkje meir (1989), Det svær æ på (1992), and Æ gjer mæ ikkje (1994).

In 1976, he wrote a biography of football player and coach Harald Berg. He wrote the autobiography Småkarer under frostmåne in 1990, a collaboration with Arvid Hanssen. In 1994, he wrote the art book Og langsomt kom lyset in collaboration with visual artist Kaare Espolin Johnson.

In 1989, the play Oluf was staged on Hålogaland Teater, based on his characters, where Arntzen himself played the principal character. The play was the most successful until then for Hålogaland Teater. It was eventually aired on television, and also earned him a Spellemannprisen award for 1991. In 1996, he toured Norway with the performance Den fordømte nordlendingen. This was also adapted for television, and the material was made into a book in 1998.

In 1994, he was appointed professor II in humour at the University of Tromsø. He was awarded the Leonard Statuette for 1999, and was decorated Knight, First Class of the Order of St. Olav in 2000.

Arntzen died in Tromsø on 19 December 2025, at the age of 88.

== Selected works ==
- Han Oluf (1967)
- Ho Emma (1968)
- Han Lars (1970)
- Rallkattlia (1972)
- Oluf R (1974)
- Dutte (1976)
- Æ lyg ikkje (1986)
- Æ sei ikkje meir (1989)
- Småkarer under frostmåne (with Arvid Hanssen; 1990)
- Det svær æ på (1992)
- Æ gjer mæ ikkje (1994)
- Og langsomt kom lyset (with Kaare Espolin Johnson; 1994)
- Dokker kan flire (1996)
- Den fordømte nordlending. Et historisk tilbakeblikk (with Dagfinn Bakke; 1998)
