= Tryggve Andersen =

Norwegian writer (1886–1920)

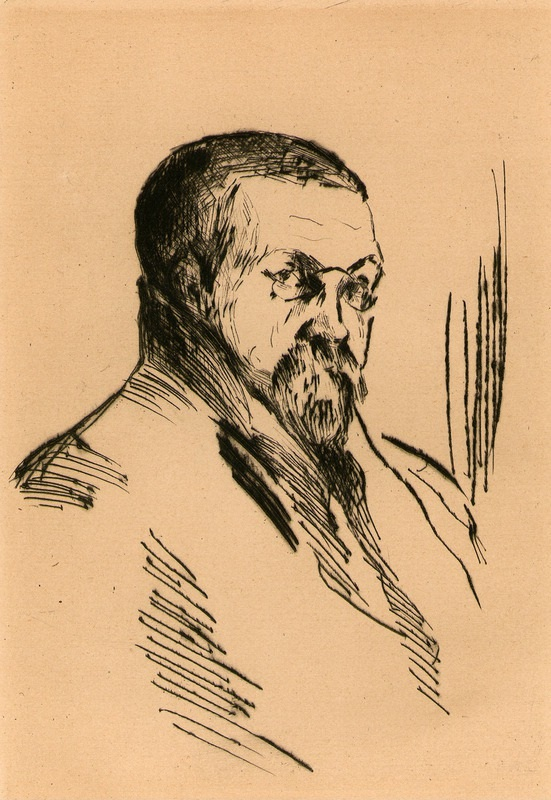
Portrait by Henrik Lund

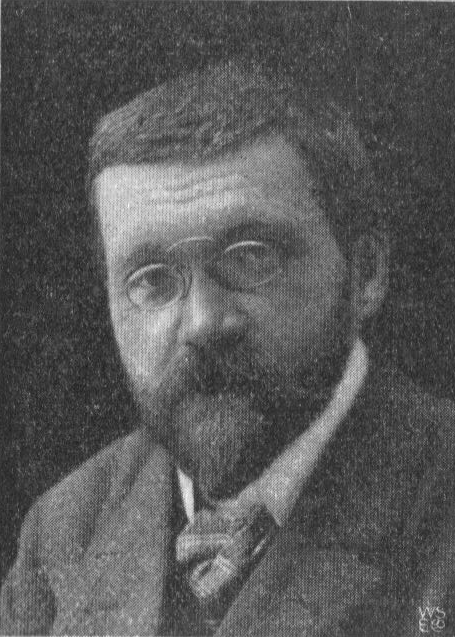
Photograph by Karl Anderson

Tryggve Andersen (27 September 1866 – 10 April 1920) was a Norwegian novelist, poet, and story writer.

== Biography ==
Andersen was born on 27 September 1866 in Ringsaker Municipality, Norway. He was one of ten children born to Christen Andersen (1825–1893) and Antonette Krogvig (1840–1932). His father was a trader and later bailiff. When Andersen was nine years old, the family moved to Tysnes Municipality in Hardanger. In 1878, Andersen entered Bergen Cathedral School. He later attended school in Hamar and took his student exams in 1885. He attended the University of Kristiania until 1892 but did not graduate. He subsequently became an office worker in Hamar.

Andersen made his literary debut in 1897 with the historical novel collection I Cancelliraadens dage, a collection of tales from the early 1800s in the Norwegian Uplands. It was received with great enthusiasm and earned him an endowment. The book is commonly viewed as a highlight in Andersen's work. It is regarded a pioneer work of its kind and was later analyzed by several literary historians.

Among his other works are the poetry collection Digte from 1898, and the novel Mod kvæld from 1900. From 1904 to 1919, he published five collections of narratives and novels including Gamle folk og andre fortællinger (1904), Bispesønnen og andre fortellinger (1907), Hjemfærd (1913), and Fabler og hændelser (1915).

Andersen suffered from various health problems. From adolescence, Andersen suffered from melancholy and depression. In later years he was diagnosed with epilepsy. He died in Gran Municipality on 10 April 1920. He has been portrayed by painters Henrik Lund, Olav Engebrigtsen, and Karl Konow. Sculptor Jens Munthe Svendsen (1869–1957) made a bronze bust of him in 1920.

== Personal life ==
He was married three times: in 1898 to Margrethe Schønberg (1871–1901); in 1906 to the author Regine Normann (1867–1939); and in 1914 to Margarethe Tichauer (1891–1938).
