= Olaf Benneche =

Norwegian writer and playwright

- Born: 18 September 1883; Kristiansand, Norway
- Died: 17 December 1931 (aged 48)
- Occupations: Novelist, children's writer and playwright

Olaf Benneche (18 September 1883 – 17 December 1931) was a Norwegian novelist, children's writer and playwright.

== Biography ==
He was born in Kristiansand. He took his secondary education at Kristiansand Cathedral School, and graduated from there in 1901. He made his literary début in 1904 with the story Marie Louise Reventlow. From 1911 to 1913 he published a trilogy of historical novels from the valley Setesdalen, Rygnestadgutten, Knekten Mundius and De bønder av Raabygdelag. His last important novel was Juvet in 1928.

In 1930 he was appointed head of Kringkastingsselskapet's newly established district office for broadcasting in Kristiansand. The first broadcast from "Kristiansand Kringkaster" was on 17 December 1930. His assistant was Julius Hougen (1906-1993) who took over when Benneche died in 1931, and had a long and distinguished radio career.

Until his death he was a deputy member of the council of the Norwegian Defense Association (Norges Forsvarsforening). This nationwide association worksto ensure Norway's freedom and social security through a good military defense, credible alliances, and civilian preparedness. He was buried in December 1931 in Kristiansand. The street Olaf Benneches gate in Kristiansand has been named after him.

Benneche was member of Fatherland League.
