= Rikka Deinboll =

Norwegian librarian and translator

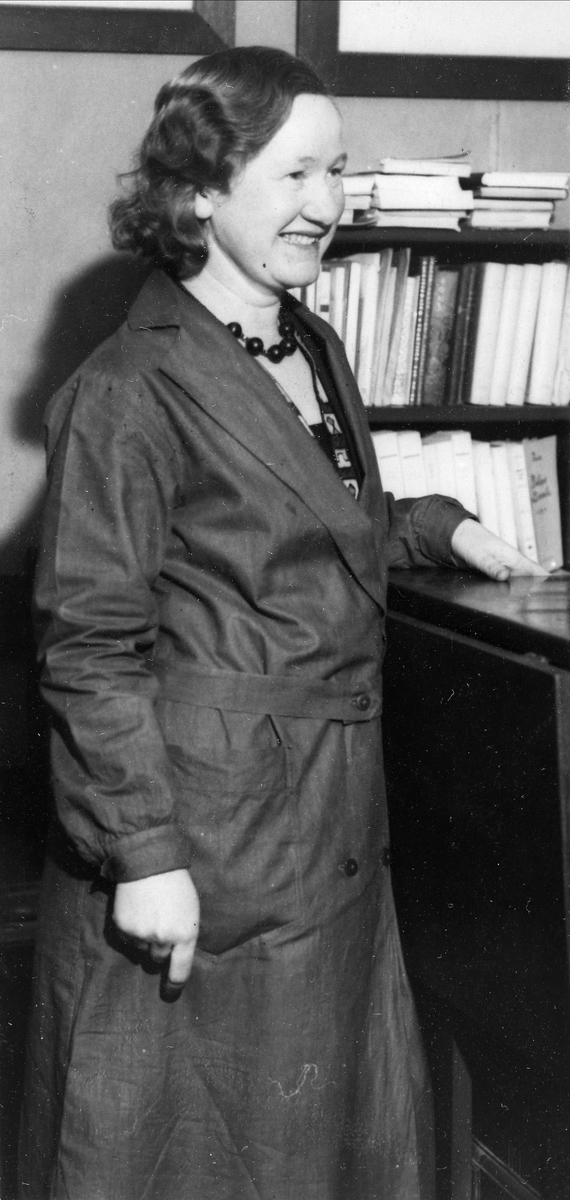
- Born: March 15, 1897; Hamar, Norway
- Died: February 18, 1973 (aged 75); Oslo, Norway
- Occupation: Translator
- Awards: King's Medal of Merit

Fredrikke Johanne "Rikka" Bjølgerud Deinboll (March 15, 1897 – February 18, 1973) was a Norwegian librarian and translator. She is known for her work in developing school libraries in Oslo, and for creating the Norwegian name Ole Brumm for the character Winnie-the-Pooh when she produced the first Norwegian translation of the book Winnie-the-Pooh in 1932, six years after it was published in English.

Deinboll was born in Hamar. After obtaining her examen artium in 1916 and graduating from normal school in 1918 in Hamar, she worked at the children's and school department of the Oslo Public Library from 1918 to 1963, heading it from 1921 onward. She also worked at the Brooklyn Public Library in New York City in 1921, and at the public library in Sarpsborg in 1947. In 1927 she married August Deinboll (1880–1975), who was the father of the Norwegian cartoonist Tore Deinboll (1910–1988). Deinboll received the King's Medal of Merit in gold in 1963.

== Translations ==
- George Alfred Henty (1922). Buskliv i Australien: Ruben Whitney's oplevelser (= Among the Bushrangers from A Final Reckoning). Damm. (Translated from English)
- Lucy Fitch Perkins (1923). De hollandske tvillinger (= The Dutch Twins). Aschehoug. (Translated from English)
- Lucy Fitch Perkins (1925). De japanske tvillinger (= The Japanese Twins). Aschehoug. (Translated from English)
- Harry W. French (1926). Araberguttens lanse (= The Lance Of Kanana; A Story Of Arabia). Stenersens Forlag. (Translated from English)
- Lilian Kjellberg (1929). Ulla i Villa Martha (= Ulla i Ivy House. En svensk flickas upplevelser i en engelsk flickpension). Gyldendal. (Translated from Swedish)
- Jeanna Oterdahl (1931). Den blå fuglen (= Min fågel blå och andra flickhistorier samt ett sagospel). Norli. (Translated from Swedish)
- Bertha Holst (1931). Vibeke (= Vibe). Aschehoug. (Translated from Danish)
- Viva Lütken (1932). Om jeg var gutt, fortellinger for unge piker (= Den vide – vide verden: Fortælling for unge piger). Aschehoug. (Translated from Danish)
- A. A. Milne (1932). Ole Brumm (= Winnie-the-Pooh). Gyldendal. (Translated from English)
- Inga Bergfält (pseudonym of Erik Juel, 1933). Småen fra Bretagne (= Ensam i världen - Berättelse för flickor). Aschehoug. (Translated from Swedish)
- Nanny Hammarström (1934). I maurlandet (= Två myrors äventyr). Cappelen. (Translated from Swedish)
- Elizabeth Foreman Lewis (1935). Kinesergutten Fu = Young Fu of the Upper Yangtze). Aschehoug. (Translated from English)
- Waldo Fleming (1938). Trommene taler, en guttefortelling fra den afrikanske gullkyst (= Talking Drums). Aschehoug. (Translated from English)
- Alice Geer Kelsey (1955). Hodja, tyrkiske eventyr (= Once the Hodja). Aschehoug. (Translated from English)

== Original works ==
- Håndbok i norsk barnebibliotekarbeide (= Norsk bibliotekforenings småskrifter 7), 1927
- Rikka Deinboll (1936). Barnerim og barneregler. Aschehoug. (illustrated by Albert Jærn)
- Rikka Deinboll (1936–54). Boken i undervisningen. Oslo folkeskoler and Deichmanske bibliotek. (together with Aud Risberg)
- Rikka Deinboll (1938). Deichmanbøker til alle oslobarn. Oslo.
- Rikka Deinboll, Karsten Heli, Marianne Rumohr, & Åse Gruda Skard (1938). Barn og bøker. Tiden forlag. (= Barn og opdragelse 3)
- Rikka Deinboll (1942). Folkeskolebarnas leseinteresse. Norsk pedagogisk tidsskrift 5
- Rikka Deinboll (1950). Bøker for barn og ungdom opp til ca. 15 år: Bøker som fås i bokhandelen. Et utvalg. Oslo.
- Rikka Deinboll (1950–1951). Skolebiblioteker i Oslo gjennom tiden. Osloskolen 5–6
- Rikka Deinboll (1953). Dikken Zwilgmeyer: En bibliografi med innledning. Oslo.
- Rikka Deinboll (1951). Hvem banker? Rim og remser fra her og der. Aschehoug. (illustrated by Grethe Berger)
- Rikka Deinboll (1954). Bøker til fritid og undervisning. Oslo.
- Rikka Deinboll et al. (1956). Kriminal- og sexbladene: En rapport. Oslo: Det rådgivende utvalg for tegneserier etter oppdrag av Statens folkeopplysningsråd.
- Helge Sverre Nesheim, ed. (1962). Barnas verden. Aschehoug. (part of the editorial team)
- Various authors (1960s). Mitt skattkammer. Teknisk forlag. (various translators)
