= Julius Hougen =

Norwegian jurist and radio personality

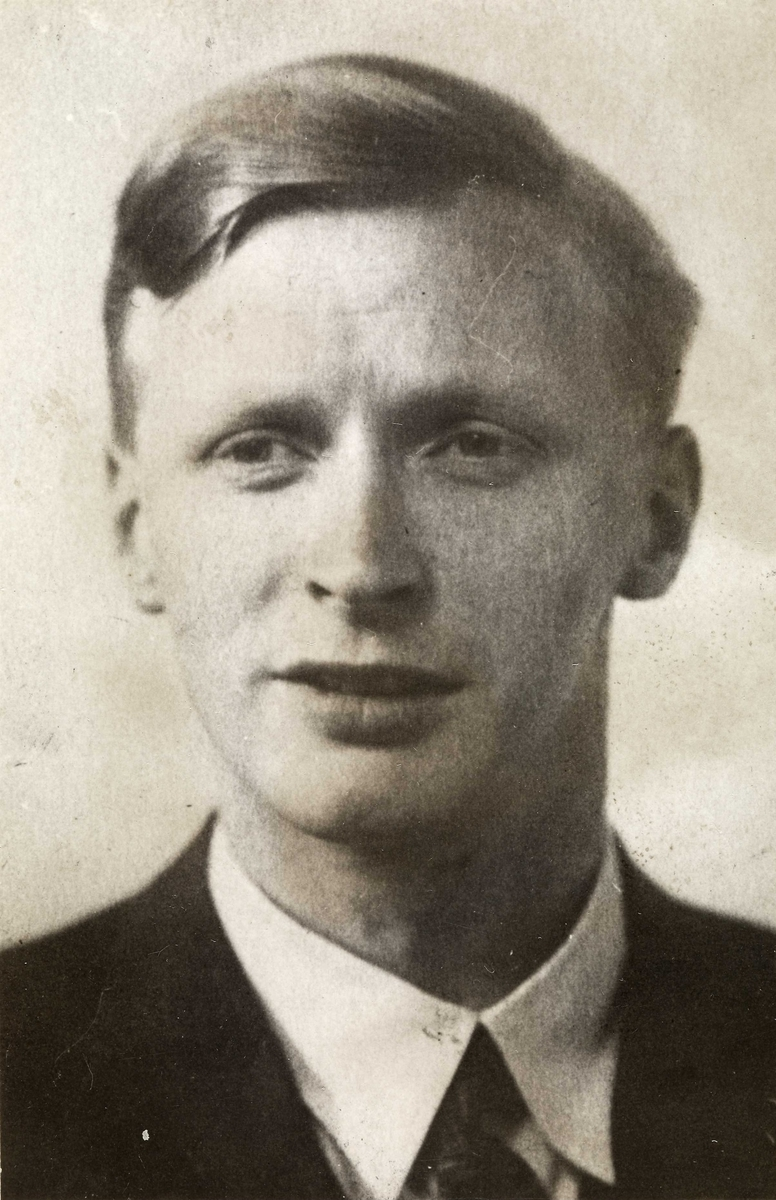
- Julius Hougen in 1935
- Born: 7 November 1906; Kristiansand, Norway
- Died: 19 December 1993 (aged 87)
- Occupations: jurist and radio personality

Julius Hougen (7 November 1906 – 19 December 1993) was a Norwegian jurist and radio personality. He became known as the voice from Sørlandet over a period of more than forty years, eventually as a leader of the Norwegian Broadcasting Corporation's district office in Kristiansand.

== Early career and personal life ==
Hougen was born in Kristiansand as the son of lecturer Paul Fredrik Hougen and Aagot Sofie Svendsen. He finished had his secondary education at the Kristiansand Cathedral School in 1925. He was cand.jur. from 1930, and finished the Police School in 1932. The broadcasting company Kringkastingsselskapet was established as an office in Kristiansand in 1930, with Olaf Benneche as leader and Hougen as his assistant. When Benneche died in 1931, Hougen was responsible for the Kristiansand office, in addition to being an assistant judge in Kristiansand. The State-controlled Norwegian Broadcasting Corporation (Norwegian: Norsk Rikskringkasting, NRK) took over after Kringkastingsselskapet in 1933. During the 1930s Hougen worked part-time for NRK as well as being a police officer. He became known as "the voice from Sørlandet", introducing the popular characters "shipmate Kristiansen and ship's engineer Tønnesen". In 1936 he married teacher Signe Hangeland.

== World War II ==
During the occupation of Norway by Nazi Germany Hougen participated in resistance work. He was a member of Arne Laudal's organization, while working at the Price Police in Kristansand. He was arrested in December 1942, and transferred to the Grini concentration camp in January 1943, being incarcerated at Grini for two years until January 1945. Six of the members of Laudal's organization were later sentenced to death and shot at Trandum in May 1944. While being at Grini, he was placed at the "death cell" called "Fallskjermen" for a period, and later as ordinary camp prisoner. In the prisoner's documentary book on Grini (Griniboken. 1946.) Hougen wrote a chapter about the life at "Fallskjermen", including a list of those prisoners who were brought out to be shot.

== Post-war career ==
Hougen was a reporter for NRK when King Haakon VII returned to Oslo 7 June 1945. He later co-chaired the first large-scale charity fundraising campaigns in Norwegian radio. The institution Nasjonalhjelpen received more than 100 million kr. Later the Norwegian Radium Hospital was subject to similar fund-raising.

After a short period in Oslo Hougen started working for the Norwegian Broadcasting Corporation's district office in his home city Kristiansand. From 1967 he was leader of the Kristiansand branch (NRK Sørlandet) until his retirement in 1976, when he was succeeded by Håkon Karlsen. He died in Kristiansand on 19 December 1993.
