= Arne Durban =

Norwegian sculptor and art critic

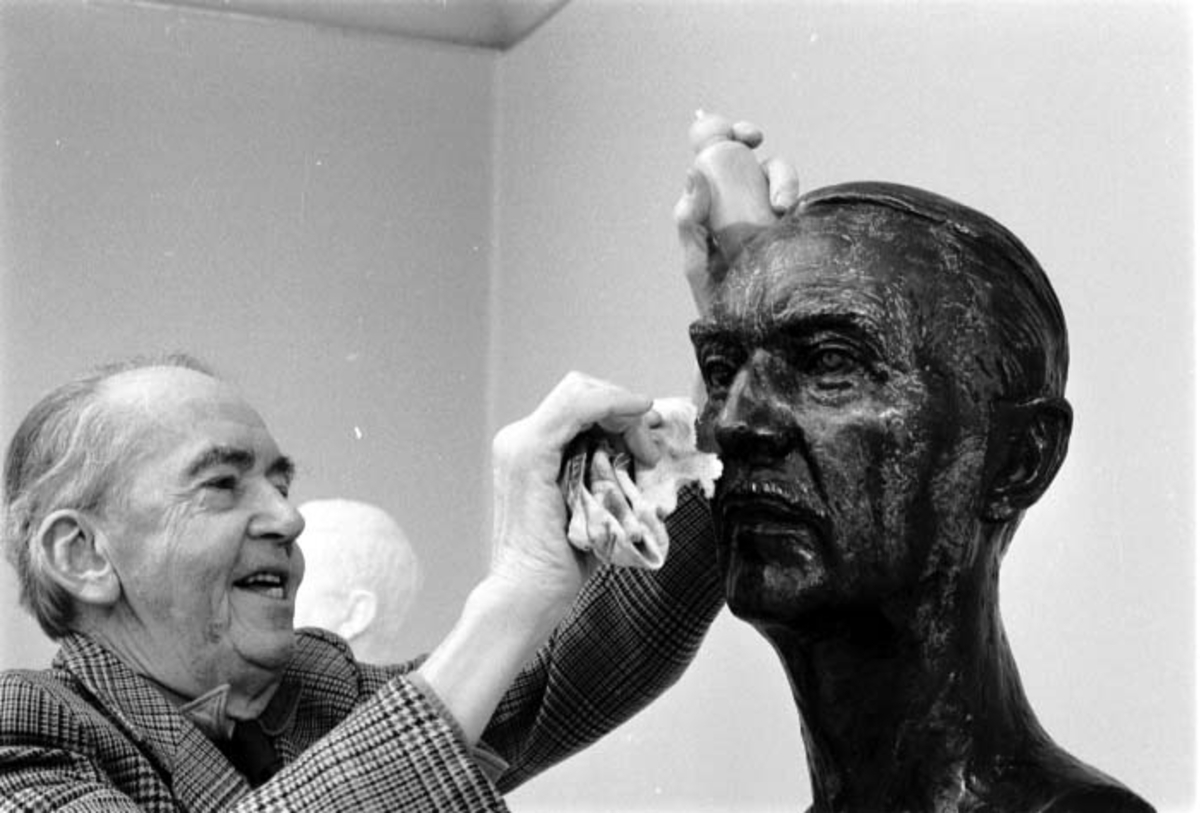
Arne Durban with his bust of Henrik Groth.

Arne Durban (16 June 1912 – 18 March 1993) was a Norwegian sculptor and art critic. He was born in Kristiania, and was a brother of Halvor Durban-Hansen. His works are represented in more than thirty cities in Norway. Among his works are sculptures of Oscar Mathisen and Anders Sandvig, and busts of Rudolph Thygesen and Henrik Groth. He wrote art critics for the newspapers Morgenbladet, Morgenposten and Handels- og Sjøfartstidende, columns for the magazines Magasinet For Alle and Farmand, and biographies of Christian Sinding, Gustav Vigeland and Kaare Espolin Johnson.
