= Håkon Karlsen =

Norwegian journalist (1922–2007)

Håkon Karlsen (March 5, 1922 – May 6, 2007) was a Norwegian journalist.

Karlsen was born in Trondheim. During the Second World War, he escaped to neutral Sweden from Hattfjelldal Municipality, where he had been set to perform conscripted labor. After attending Uppsala University, Karlsen worked as a teacher in Strinda Municipality. He was employed by NRK at Trøndelag Broadcasting (Trøndelag Kringkaster) from 1947 to 1964, at NRK Troms from 1964 to 1976, and at NRK Sørlandet from 1976 onward, succeeding Julius Hougen. Karlsen was centrally engaged in the NRK Children's and Youth Department (NRK Barne- og ungdomsavdelingen), where he was well known for the characters Amandus and Antonsen during Children's Hour (Barnetimen) as well as the now-familiar entertainment department. He was known for having discovered the entertainer Arthur Arntzen (a.k.a. Oluf) and he took part in many radio and television programs with him, as well as the record releases Ja, du Oluf (Cat Music, 1973) and Mølje & sodd (Dagbladets Sommerkassett, 1980) and the films Førti år med Oluf (Forty Years with Oluf; 1979) and Oluf – No må du skjærpe dæ, gutt (Oluf—Now You Need to Shape Up, Boy; 1991).

== Publications ==
- Marulken (Oslo: Aschehoug, 1962)
- Amandus og Antonsen (Oslo: Tiden, 1983)
