= Olav Engebrigtsen =

Norwegian painter and illustrator (1878–1962)

Olav Engebrigtsen (15 January 1878 – 15 April 1962) was a Norwegian painter and illustrator. He was born in Kristiania. He studied art with Harriet Backer for four years, with Kristian Zahrtmann in Copenhagen, and with Henri Matisse in Paris. From 1911 to 1940 he was appointed as illustrator for the newspaper Tidens Tegn. Among his book illustrations are Margrethe Munthe's songbooks Kom skal vi synge, Bernhard Stokke's children's book Dag fra skogene, and contributions to various basal readers for primary school. He is represented at the National Gallery of Norway, in Oslo Bymuseum and in Riksgalleriet. He died in Oslo in 1962.
