= Øivind Bolstad =

Norwegian writer

- Born: 1 February 1905
- Died: 7 May 1979 (aged 74)
- Occupations: Playwright, novelist
- Awards: Dobloug Prize

Øivind Bolstad (1 February 1905 – 7 May 1979) was a Norwegian playwright and novelist.

Bolstad was born at Vardø in Finnmark, Norway. He made his literary breakthrough with the novel Den røde begonia from 1947.

Bolstad published a number of short stories and narratives in both Norwegian and foreign magazines as well as a series of books and narrations.

In 1973 he became the recipient of the Dobloug Prize literature award in 1973.

== Selected works ==
- De gylne lenker – (1945)
- Den røde begonia – (1947)
- Profitøren – (1947)
- Gamle Winckels testament – (1949)
- Spøkefuglen på Toska. Historier fra strilelandet – (1955)
- Fortellinger og fabler – (1966)
- Dødens tango – (1967)
- Apassionata – r (1968)
- Jorunn – (1969)
- Bergensikon – (1970)
- Sort messe – (1970)
- Bolstad forteller – (1971)
- Tilgi oss ikke for Helene – (1975)
- Duell med døden – (1977)
