= Tore Deinboll =

Norwegian artist, cartoonist, and illustrator

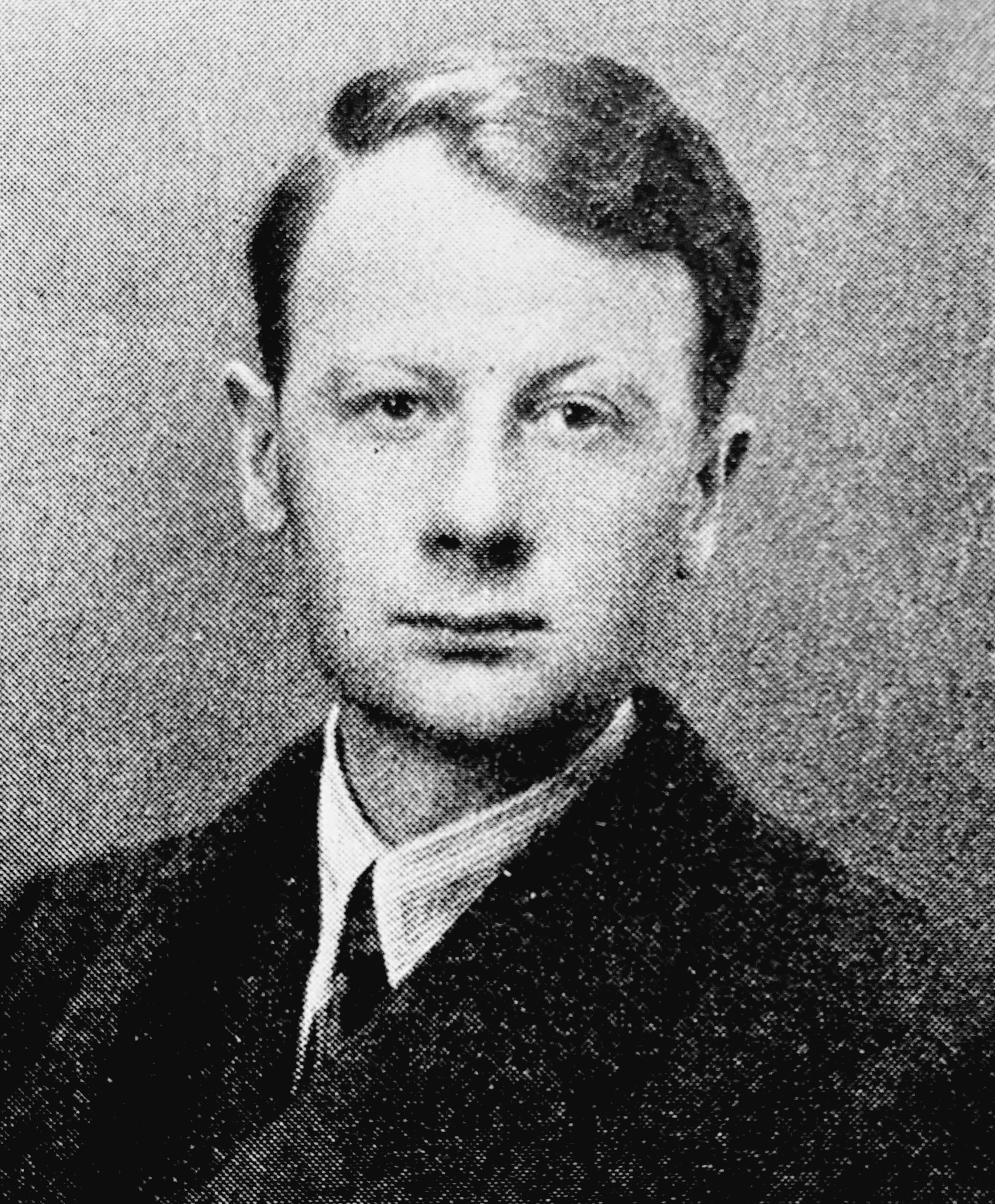
- Tore Eckhoff Deinboll
- Born: July 12, 1910; Oslo, Norway
- Died: November 18, 1988 (aged 78); Oslo, Norway
- Occupation: Cartoonist

Tore Eckhoff Deinboll (July 12, 1910 – November 18, 1988) was a Norwegian artist, cartoonist, and illustrator.

Deinboll was born in Oslo, the son of the patent attorney August Deinboll (1880–1975) and the teacher Anna Hermine Eckhoff (1884–1967), and was later the stepson of the librarian Rikka Deinboll (1897–1973). He studied in the painting program at the Norwegian National Academy of Fine Arts. There he became acquainted with several artists, including Kaare Espolin Johnson, the brothers Olav and Trygve Mosebekk, and Edvarda Lie. Deinboll became especially good friend with Espolin Johnson.

As a cartoonist, Deinboll was known for the comics Den evige ilds land (The Land of Eternal Fire, 1936–1937) and Petter Framgutt (1938). Both series were published as weekly full-page works in the magazine Arbeidermagasinet.

== Work with Arbeidermagasinet ==
Tore Deinboll and Trygve Mosebekk soon became aware of opportunities to contribute to Arbeidermagasinet. Their drawings commissioned for newspapers and Christmas editions were not only an artistic challenge, but also a vital source of income. Deinboll had close contact with the first editor of Arbeidermagasinet, the author and journalist Otto Luihn.

Through the commissions that Deinboll received from Luihn for Arbeidermagasinet, his drawing gradually adopted an ideological orientation. This eventually resulted in Deinboll endorsing "social art". Art was often associated with the upper class, but Deinboll's choice of "social art" meant that the artist participated in the struggle of the working class. The big money was in the upper class, and so such a choice was ideologically justified. Deinboll therefore considered his effort to create illustrations for Arbeidermagasinet to be his life task, and this was the main artistic work for which he is also remembered.
