= Regine Normann =

Norwegian school teacher, novelist and story writer (1867–1939)

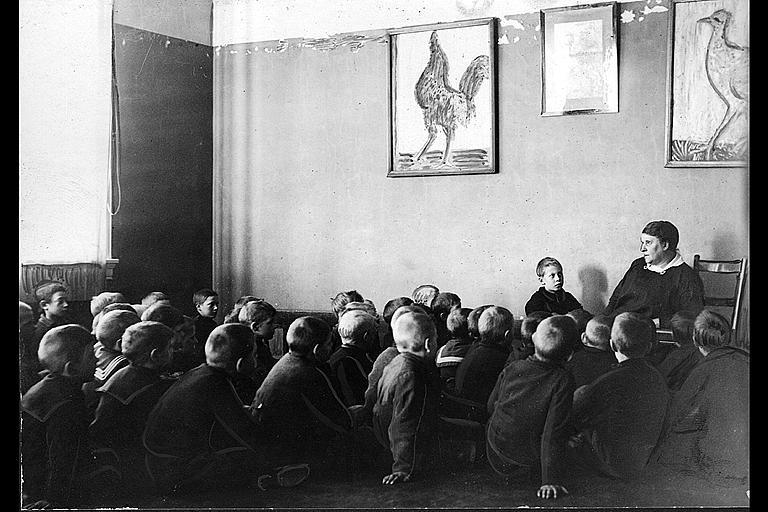
- Regine Normann tells fairy tales to "her boys" in 1933.
- Born: 29 July 1867; Bø, Norway
- Died: 14 August 1939 (aged 72); Skånland, Troms
- Occupation(s): Novelist, story writer, school teacher

Regine Normann (29 July 1867 – 14 August 1939) was a Norwegian school teacher, novelist and story writer.

== Early life and education ==
Serine Regine Normann was born in Bø Municipality in Nordland, Norway. She was the daughter of Mikkel Normann (1827–71) and Tina Amalie Lockert (1844–1933). Her father died when she was four years old and her mother was left with five young children. She was sent to relatives living outside the town of Harstad when she was five years old.

She graduated from Olaf Berg's Higher Teacher Education School in Kristiania (now Oslo) in 1897.

== Teaching and writing career ==
Normann was appointed a schoolteacher at Kristiania Folk School in 1901. Up until her retirement in 1932, she worked at Sofienberg School in Oslo.

She made her literary debut in 1905 with the novel Krabvaag. Among her other novels are Stængt (1906), Barnets tjenere (1910) and Faafengt (1911). She published several collections of fairy tales, including Eventyr (1925), Nye eventyr (1926), Nordlandsnatt (1927), and Det gråner mot høst (1930). She published 18 books in total and her fairy tales have remained in print been out of print since they first appeared. In 1940, André Bjerke wrote that “very few in this century have been able to compose true fairy tales. Actually, I can only think of three: Rudyard Kipling, Selma Lagerlöf, and Regine Normann”.

== Personal life ==
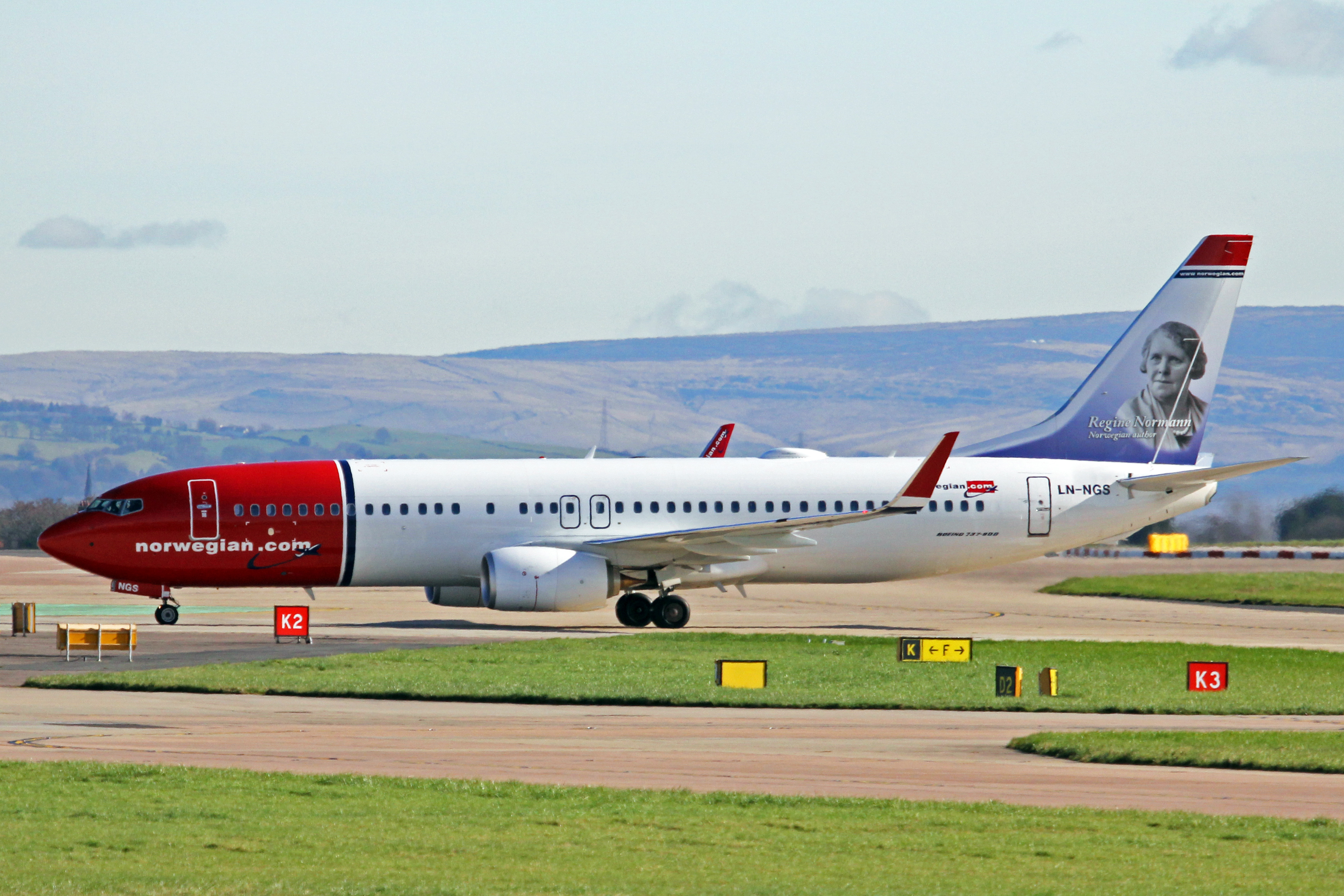
LN-NGS B737-8JPW Norwegian Air Shuttle MAN 10MAR14

When Normann was 17, she married Peder Johnsen. The marriage was unhappy and after 10 years of marriage, she left her husband. In 1906, she was married to author Tryggve Andersen (1866–1920). Their marriage dissolved in 1913.

From 1913 to 1932 she was a board member of the Norwegian Authors' Union. She received several awards including the Petter Dass Medal (Petter Dass-medaljen) in 1932 and the King's Medal of Merit (Kongens fortjenstmedalje) in 1937.

In 1939, she moved to her farm in Skånland Municipality in Troms county where she died during 1939.

== Commemoration ==
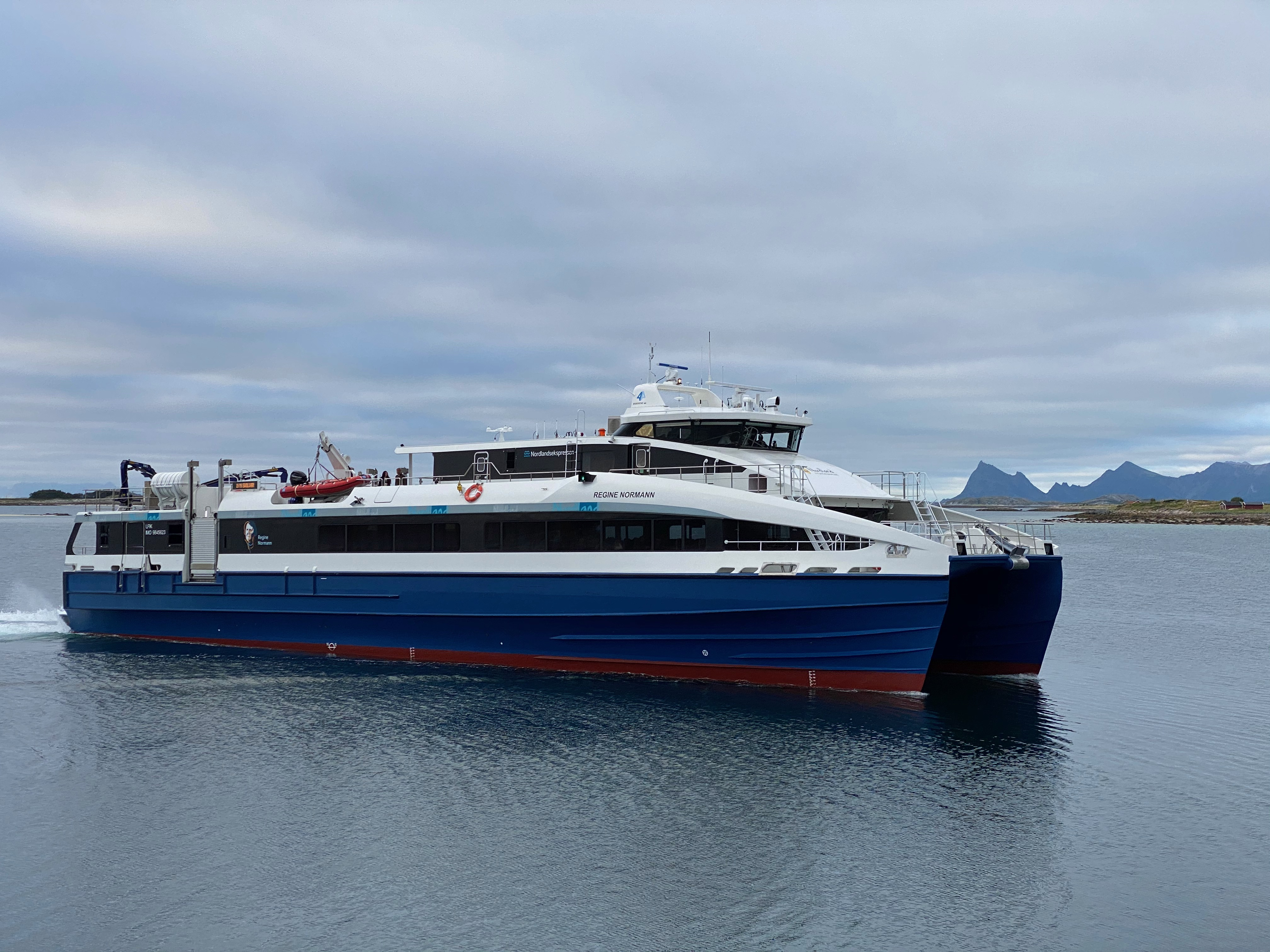
Passenger Vessel Regine Normann

Normann's photograph was featured on the tail livery of a Norwegian Air plane in 2014. A passenger ferry between Bodø to Svolvær is named in her honour.
