= Lødingen Municipality =

Municipality in Nordland, Norway

Lødingen Municipality Lødingen kommune Lodegiid suohkan (Northern Sami)
- Municipality
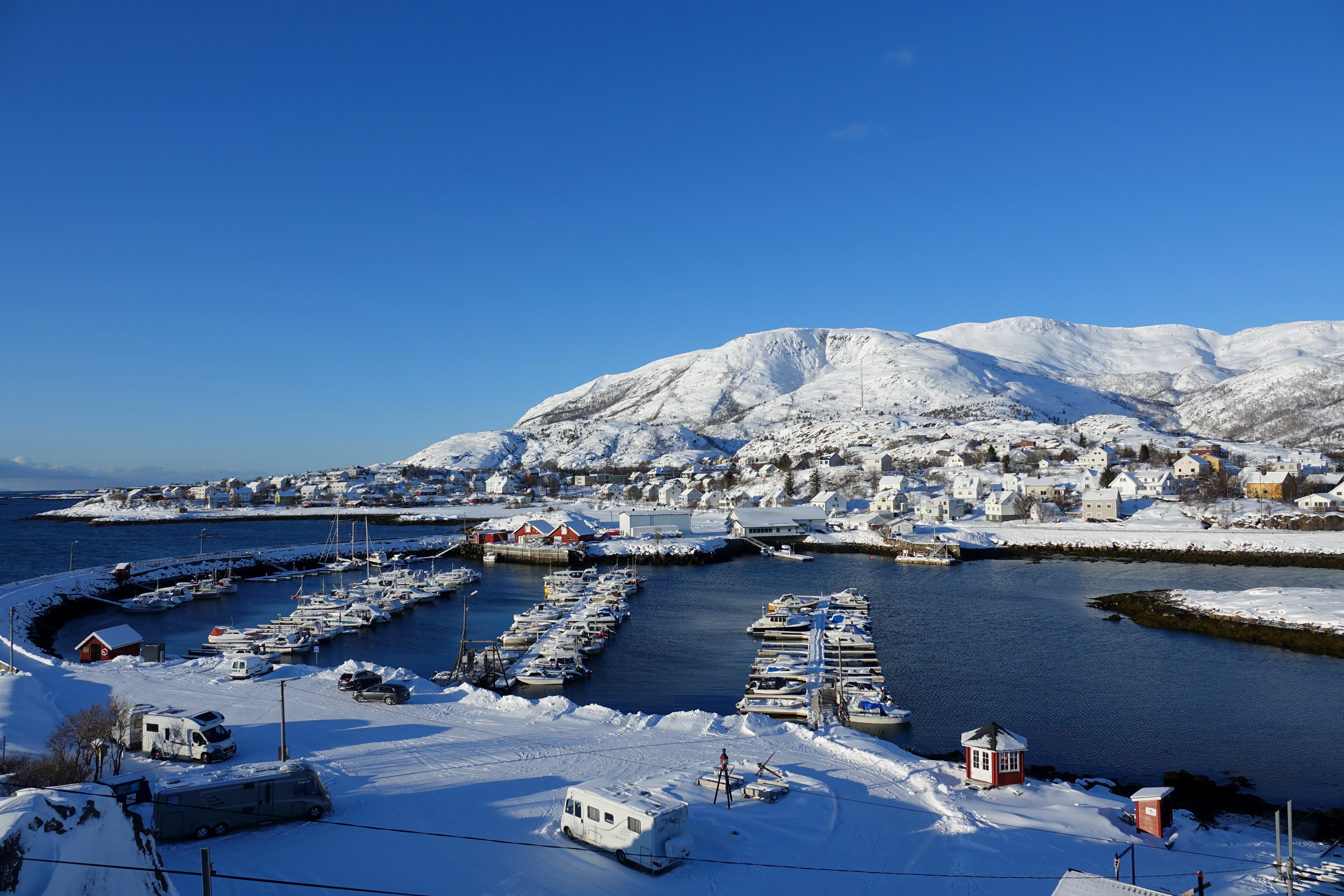
- Lødingen City seen from Hjertholmen lighthouse

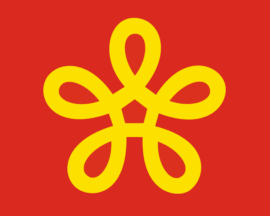
- Flag Coat of arms
- Nickname: Biketown
- Nordland within Norway

- Lødingen within Nordland
- Coordinates: 68°24′15″N 15°34′17″E
- Country: Norway
- County: Nordland
- District: Ofoten
- Established: 1 Jan 1838
  - Created as: Formannskapsdistrikt
- Administrative centre: Lødingen

Government
  - Mayor (2019): Hugo Jacobsen (Ap)

Area
  - Total: 527.41 km^{2} (203.63 sq mi)
  - Land: 507.67 km^{2} (196.01 sq mi)
  - Water: 19.74 km^{2} (7.62 sq mi) 3.7%
  - Rank: #201 in Norway
- Highest elevation: 1,263.66 m (4,145.9 ft)

Population (2024)
  - Total: 2,060
  - Rank: #279 in Norway
  - Density: 3.9/km^{2} (10/sq mi)
  - Change (10 years): ▼ −8.4%
- Demonym: Lødingsværing

Official language
  - Norwegian form: Bokmål
- Time zone: UTC+01:00 (CET)
  - Summer (DST): UTC+02:00 (CEST)
- ISO 3166 code: NO-1851
- Website: Official website

Lødingen (Northern Sami: Lodegak) is a municipality in Nordland county in Norway. Lødingen is located on the southeastern corner of the island of Hinnøya, and is part of the traditional district of Ofoten. The administrative centre of the municipality is the village of Lødingen. Other villages in the municipality include Våge and Ytterstad. Lødingen has the nickname "Biketown" because it hosts several annual bicycle races, including "Lofoten Insomnia" and Vestbygd-rittet.

The 527-square-kilometre (203 sq mi) municipality is by area the 201st largest out of the 357 municipalities in Norway. Lødingen Municipality is the 279th most populous municipality in Norway with a population of 2,060. The municipality's population density is 3.9 inhabitants per square kilometre (10/sq mi) and its population has decreased by 8.4% over the previous 10-year period.

== General information ==
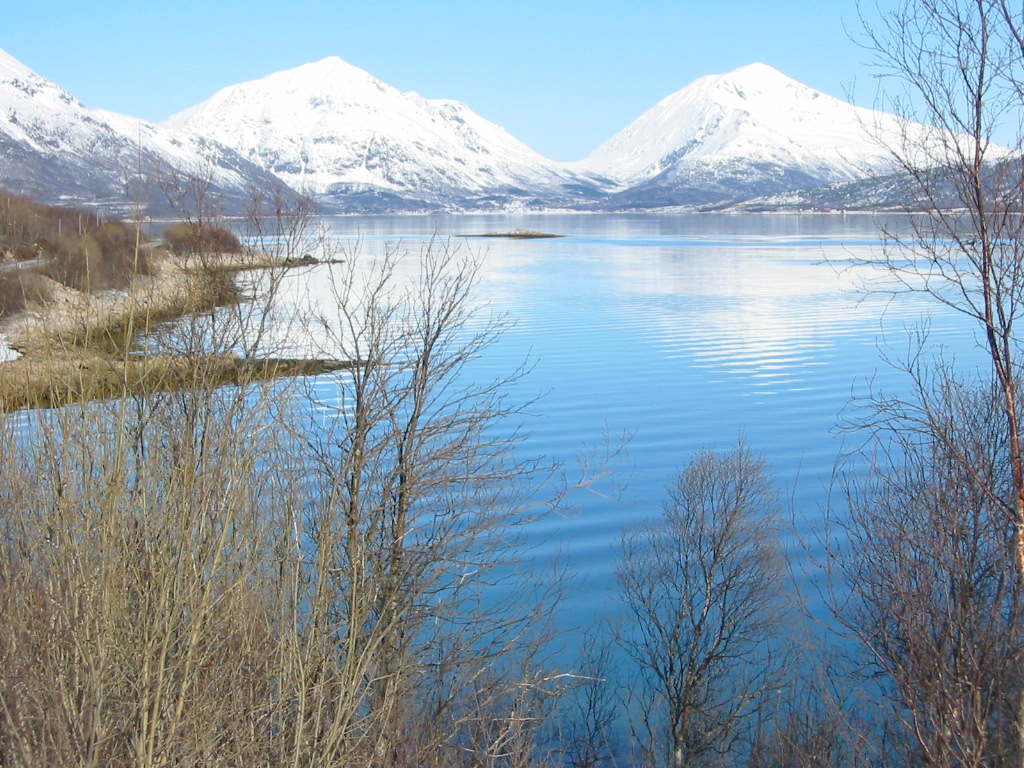
View north into Tjeldsundet from just north of Lødingen village

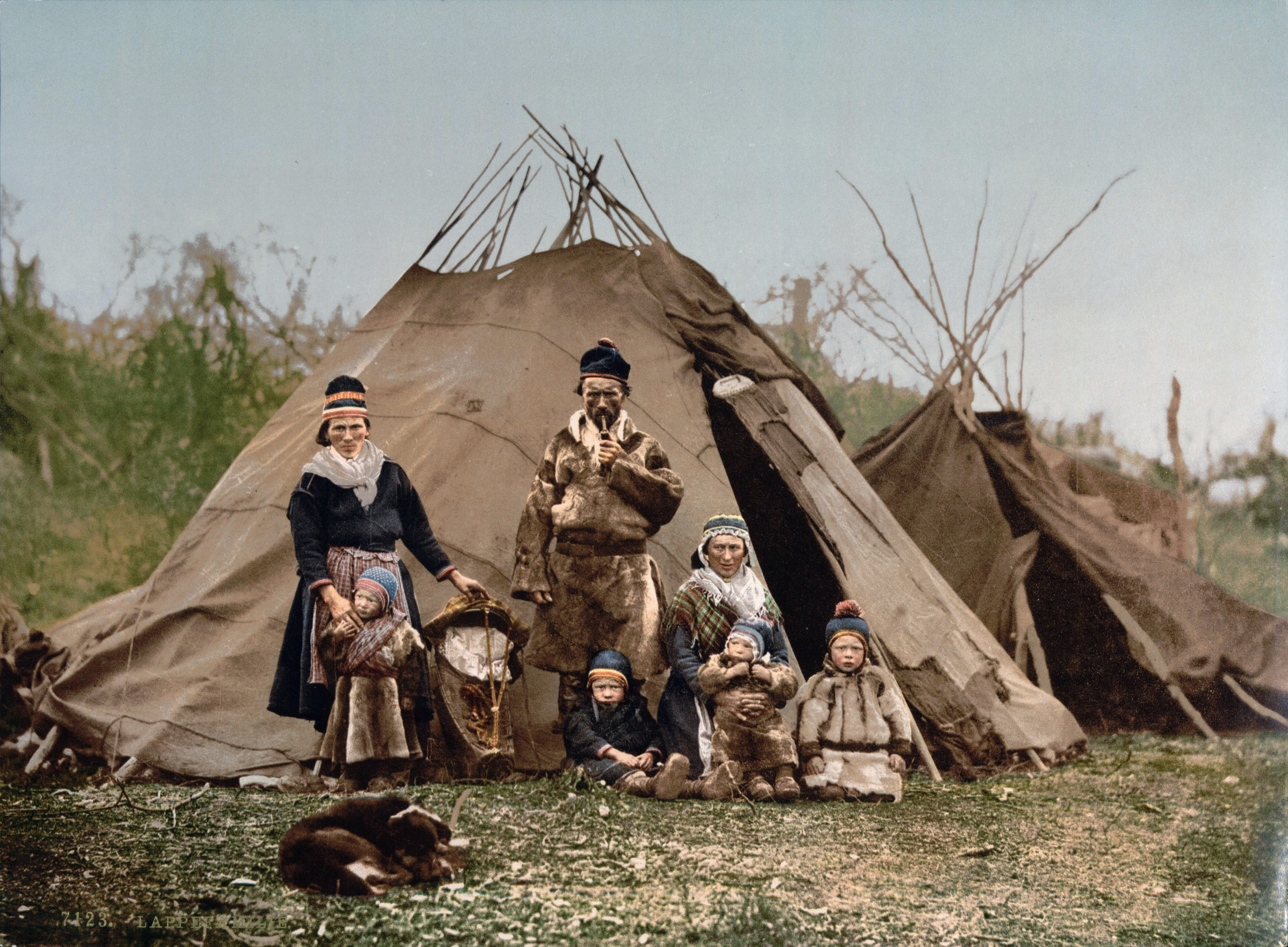
Saami family near Kanstad, Lødingen, 1896. Some of the descendants of the children in the photograph are reindeer herders in the area to this date.

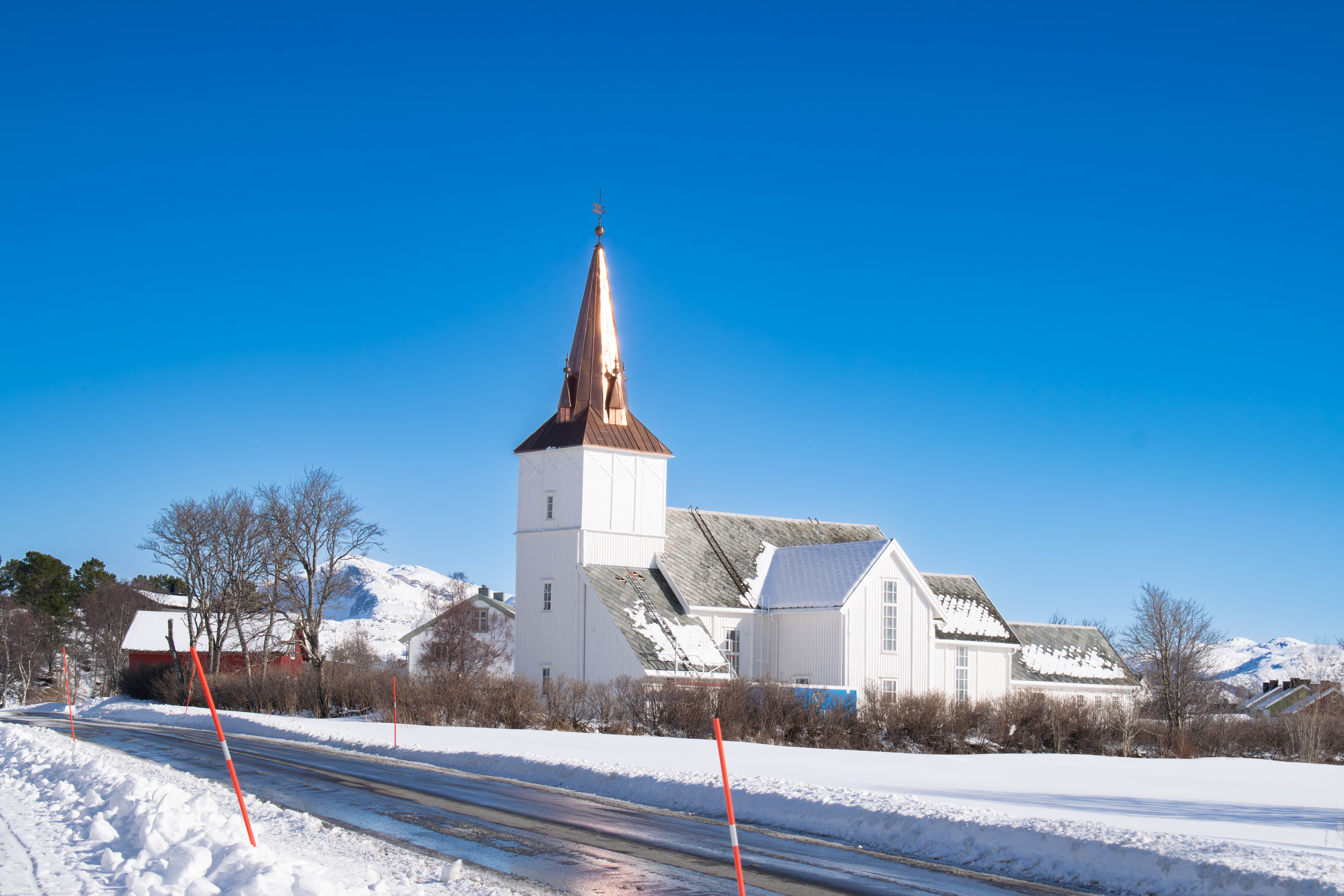
Lødingen Church

The municipality of Lødingen was established on 1 January 1838 (see formannskapsdistrikt law). On 1 January 1869, the southern district of Lødingen surrounding the Tysfjorden on the mainland (population: 1,402) was separated to form the new Tysfjord Municipality. This left 2,064 residents in Lødingen. Then on 1 January 1909, the northeastern district of Lødingen (population: 1,404) was separated to form the new Tjeldsund Municipality. This left 3,034 residents in Lødingen.

During the 1960s, there were many municipal mergers across Norway due to the work of the Schei Committee. On 1 January 1962, the southern mainland part of Lødingen surrounding the Efjorden and the island of Barøya (population: 433) were transferred to Ballangen Municipality. Then on 1 January 1964, the eastern part of Lødingen on the island of Tjeldøya (population: 297) was transferred to Tjeldsund Municipality.

=== Name ===
The municipality (originally the parish) is named after the old Lødingen farm (Old Norse: Lǫðueng) since the first Lødingen Church was built there. The first element is the genitive case of laða which means "grain barn" or "hay barn". The last element is eng which means "meadow".

=== Coat of arms ===
The coat of arms was granted on 11 May 1984. The official blazon is "Gules, a five-looped knot Or" (Norwegian: I rødt en femsløyfet gull valknute). This means the arms have a red field (background) and the charge is a five-looped knot that is made out of woollen thread and folded to look like a flower with five leaves. The woolen knot has a tincture of Or which means it is commonly colored yellow, but if it is made out of metal, then gold is used. The design was chosen to symbolize that the municipality is at the junction of road, shipping, and ferry routes to five areas: Lofoten, Ofoten, Salten, Vesterålen, and Southern Troms. It is also located between five fjords: Vestfjorden, Ofotfjorden, Tysfjorden, Tjeldsundet, and Gullesfjorden. The symbol is also an ancient symbol for good fortune. The arms were designed by Øysten H. Skaugvolldal.

=== Churches ===
The Church of Norway has one parish (sokn) within Lødingen Municipality. It is part of the Ofoten prosti (deanery) in the Diocese of Sør-Hålogaland.

Churches in Lødingen Municipality
Parish (sokn)	Church name	Location of the church	Year built
Lødingen	Lødingen Church	Lødingen	1897
Lødingen	Vestbygd Church	Våge	1885

== Transportation ==
The nearest airport is Harstad/Narvik Airport, Evenes, about 73 kilometres (45 mi) away by road. Lødingen is an important ferry harbor, the car ferry to/from Bognes in Tysfjord leaves 12 times per day and takes 60 minutes. The Rotvær Lighthouse is located in Lødingen.

== Geography ==
The municipality encompasses the southern part of the island of Hinnøya. The terrain is mountainous, with several small islands and fjords. The administrative centre of the municipality is the village of Lødingen, located at the inner part of the Vestfjorden at the southern entrance of the Tjeldsundet strait.

The highest point in the municipality is the 1,263.66-metre (4,145.9 ft) tall mountain Møysalen. Møysalen is located on the northern border with Sortland Municipality and it is within Møysalen National Park.

=== Climate ===
Lødingen has continental subarctic climate in the 1961-1990 period. The Köppen Climate Classification subtype for this climate is "Dfc".

Climate data for Lødingen 1961-1990
Month	Jan	Feb	Mar	Apr	May	Jun	Jul	Aug	Sep	Oct	Nov	Dec	Year
Mean daily maximum °C (°F)	−1 (30)	−1 (30)	1 (34)	4 (39)	9 (48)	13 (55)	16 (61)	15 (59)	11 (52)	6 (43)	2 (36)	0 (32)	6 (43)
Daily mean °C (°F)	−3 (27)	−3 (27)	−2 (28)	2 (36)	6 (43)	10 (50)	13 (55)	12 (54)	9 (48)	4 (39)	0 (32)	−2 (28)	4 (39)
Mean daily minimum °C (°F)	−6 (21)	−6 (21)	−5 (23)	−1 (30)	3 (37)	7 (45)	10 (50)	9 (48)	6 (43)	1 (34)	−2 (28)	−5 (23)	1 (34)
Average rainfall mm (inches)	66 (2.6)	62 (2.4)	55 (2.2)	53 (2.1)	57 (2.2)	67 (2.6)	87 (3.4)	85 (3.3)	107 (4.2)	113 (4.4)	85 (3.3)	76 (3.0)	913 (35.7)
Average snowfall cm (inches)	32.6 (12.8)	32.1 (12.6)	21.9 (8.6)	10.8 (4.3)	0.8 (0.3)	0 (0)	0 (0)	0 (0)	0.1 (0.0)	4.6 (1.8)	16.7 (6.6)	26.6 (10.5)	146.2 (57.5)
Average precipitation days (≥ 1 mm)	13.9	12.5	11.9	11.3	10.6	10.8	12.6	12.7	14.1	15.2	13.9	14.7	154.2
Average rainy days (≥ 1 mm)	4.7	4	5	8.1	10.3	10.8	12.6	12.7	14.1	13.4	8.7	7.1	111.5
Average snowy days (≥ 1 mm)	4.8	4.1	3.1	1.4	0.1	0	0	0	0	0.6	2.2	4.2	20.5
Mean daily daylight hours	2.7	7.7	11.8	16	21.4	24	22.9	17.4	13.1	9.1	4.6	0.2	12.6
Source 1: WeatherSpark.com
Source 2: Weatherbase.com

== Government ==
Lødingen Municipality is responsible for primary education (through 10th grade), outpatient health services, senior citizen services, welfare and other social services, zoning, economic development, and municipal roads and utilities. The municipality is governed by a municipal council of directly elected representatives. The mayor is indirectly elected by a vote of the municipal council. The municipality is under the jurisdiction of the Midtre Hålogaland District Court and the Hålogaland Court of Appeal.

=== Municipal council ===
The municipal council (Kommunestyre) of Lødingen Municipality is made up of 17 representatives that are elected to four year terms. The tables below show the current and historical composition of the council by political party.

Lødingen kommunestyre 2023–2027
Party name (in Norwegian)	Number of representatives
Labour Party (Arbeiderpartiet)	7
Progress Party (Fremskrittspartiet)	3
Conservative Party (Høyre)	4
Socialist Left Party (Sosialistisk Venstreparti)	1
Joint list of the Centre Party (Senterpartiet) and the Liberal Party (Venstre)	2
Total number of members:	17

Lødingen kommunestyre 2019–2023
Party name (in Norwegian)	Number of representatives
Labour Party (Arbeiderpartiet)	5
Progress Party (Fremskrittspartiet)	3
Conservative Party (Høyre)	3
Centre Party (Senterpartiet)	3
Socialist Left Party (Sosialistisk Venstreparti)	2
Liberal Party (Venstre)	1
Total number of members:	17

Lødingen kommunestyre 2015–2019
Party name (in Norwegian)	Number of representatives
Labour Party (Arbeiderpartiet)	8
Progress Party (Fremskrittspartiet)	2
Conservative Party (Høyre)	3
Socialist Left Party (Sosialistisk Venstreparti)	2
Liberal Party (Venstre)	2
Total number of members:	17

Lødingen kommunestyre 2011–2015
Party name (in Norwegian)	Number of representatives
Labour Party (Arbeiderpartiet)	4
Progress Party (Fremskrittspartiet)	4
Conservative Party (Høyre)	5
Centre Party (Senterpartiet)	1
Socialist Left Party (Sosialistisk Venstreparti)	1
Liberal Party (Venstre)	2
Total number of members:	17

Lødingen kommunestyre 2007–2011
Party name (in Norwegian)	Number of representatives
Labour Party (Arbeiderpartiet)	5
Progress Party (Fremskrittspartiet)	7
Conservative Party (Høyre)	3
Centre Party (Senterpartiet)	2
Socialist Left Party (Sosialistisk Venstreparti)	3
Liberal Party (Venstre)	1
Total number of members:	21

Lødingen kommunestyre 2003–2007
Party name (in Norwegian)	Number of representatives
Labour Party (Arbeiderpartiet)	4
Progress Party (Fremskrittspartiet)	6
Conservative Party (Høyre)	3
Centre Party (Senterpartiet)	1
Socialist Left Party (Sosialistisk Venstreparti)	5
Liberal Party (Venstre)	2
Total number of members:	21

Lødingen kommunestyre 1999–2003
Party name (in Norwegian)	Number of representatives
Labour Party (Arbeiderpartiet)	9
Progress Party (Fremskrittspartiet)	4
Conservative Party (Høyre)	5
Centre Party (Senterpartiet)	1
Liberal Party (Venstre)	2
Total number of members:	21

Lødingen kommunestyre 1995–1999
Party name (in Norwegian)	Number of representatives
Labour Party (Arbeiderpartiet)	6
Progress Party (Fremskrittspartiet)	1
Conservative Party (Høyre)	5
Centre Party (Senterpartiet)	2
Socialist Left Party (Sosialistisk Venstreparti)	3
Liberal Party (Venstre)	4
Total number of members:	21

Lødingen kommunestyre 1991–1995
Party name (in Norwegian)	Number of representatives
Labour Party (Arbeiderpartiet)	6
Conservative Party (Høyre)	7
Centre Party (Senterpartiet)	2
Socialist Left Party (Sosialistisk Venstreparti)	4
Liberal Party (Venstre)	2
Total number of members:	21

Lødingen kommunestyre 1987–1991
Party name (in Norwegian)	Number of representatives
Labour Party (Arbeiderpartiet)	8
Conservative Party (Høyre)	10
Centre Party (Senterpartiet)	1
Socialist Left Party (Sosialistisk Venstreparti)	1
Liberal Party (Venstre)	1
Total number of members:	21

Lødingen kommunestyre 1983–1987
Party name (in Norwegian)	Number of representatives
Labour Party (Arbeiderpartiet)	9
Conservative Party (Høyre)	8
Christian Democratic Party (Kristelig Folkeparti)	1
Centre Party (Senterpartiet)	1
Socialist Left Party (Sosialistisk Venstreparti)	1
Liberal Party (Venstre)	1
Total number of members:	21

Lødingen kommunestyre 1979–1983
Party name (in Norwegian)	Number of representatives
Labour Party (Arbeiderpartiet)	7
Conservative Party (Høyre)	9
Christian Democratic Party (Kristelig Folkeparti)	1
Centre Party (Senterpartiet)	2
Socialist Left Party (Sosialistisk Venstreparti)	1
Liberal Party (Venstre)	1
Total number of members:	21

Lødingen kommunestyre 1975–1979
Party name (in Norwegian)	Number of representatives
Labour Party (Arbeiderpartiet)	9
Conservative Party (Høyre)	7
Christian Democratic Party (Kristelig Folkeparti)	1
Centre Party (Senterpartiet)	3
Joint list of the Liberal Party (Venstre) and New People's Party (Nye Folkepartiet)	1
Total number of members:	21

Lødingen kommunestyre 1971–1975
Party name (in Norwegian)	Number of representatives
Labour Party (Arbeiderpartiet)	11
Conservative Party (Høyre)	7
Centre Party (Senterpartiet)	2
Liberal Party (Venstre)	1
Total number of members:	21

Lødingen kommunestyre 1967–1971
Party name (in Norwegian)	Number of representatives
Labour Party (Arbeiderpartiet)	11
Conservative Party (Høyre)	6
Centre Party (Senterpartiet)	2
Liberal Party (Venstre)	2
Total number of members:	21

Lødingen kommunestyre 1963–1967
Party name (in Norwegian)	Number of representatives
Labour Party (Arbeiderpartiet)	10
Conservative Party (Høyre)	7
Liberal Party (Venstre)	2
Local List(s) (Lokale lister)	2
Total number of members:	21

Lødingen herredsstyre 1959–1963
Party name (in Norwegian)	Number of representatives
Labour Party (Arbeiderpartiet)	10
Conservative Party (Høyre)	6
Liberal Party (Venstre)	2
Local List(s) (Lokale lister)	3
Total number of members:	21

Lødingen herredsstyre 1955–1959
Party name (in Norwegian)	Number of representatives
Labour Party (Arbeiderpartiet)	10
Conservative Party (Høyre)	8
Liberal Party (Venstre)	3
Total number of members:	21

Lødingen herredsstyre 1951–1955
Party name (in Norwegian)	Number of representatives
Labour Party (Arbeiderpartiet)	12
Conservative Party (Høyre)	6
Liberal Party (Venstre)	3
Total number of members:	21

Lødingen herredsstyre 1947–1951
Party name (in Norwegian)	Number of representatives
Labour Party (Arbeiderpartiet)	11
Liberal Party (Venstre)	4
Joint List(s) of Non-Socialist Parties (Borgerlige Felleslister)	6
Total number of members:	21

Lødingen herredsstyre 1945–1947
Party name (in Norwegian)	Number of representatives
Labour Party (Arbeiderpartiet)	9
Local List(s) (Lokale lister)	7
Total number of members:	16

Lødingen herredsstyre 1937–1941*
Party name (in Norwegian)	Number of representatives
Labour Party (Arbeiderpartiet)	7
Joint List(s) of Non-Socialist Parties (Borgerlige Felleslister)	9
Total number of members:	16
Note: Due to the German occupation of Norway during World War II, no elections were held for new municipal councils until after the war ended in 1945.

=== Mayors ===
The mayor (Norwegian: ordfører) of Lødingen Municipality is the political leader of the municipality and the chairperson of the municipal council. Here is a list of people who have held this position:

- 1838–1840: Niels Nordbye
- 1840–1844: Jens Hagerup Krog
- 1844–1846: Bendix Normann
- 1846–1848: Johan T. Lampe
- 1848–1850: Alexander Falch
- 1850–1852: Andreas Otterbech
- 1852–1854: Willum Lind
- 1854–1859: Severin Samuelsen
- 1859–1860: Petter Kjelsberg
- 1860–1861: Severin Samuelsen
- 1861–1863: Alexander Falck
- 1863–1877: Anders Stoltenberg
- 1877–1880: Bernhard Kokk
- 1880–1882: A. Roll
- 1882–1884: Bernhard Kokk
- 1884–1885: Arent Schøning
- 1885–1904: Petter Møkleby
- 1904–1907: K. Strømstad
- 1907–1918: Gulbrand Kløvstad
- 1919–1922: K. Strømstad
- 1922–1928: Leonhard C. B. Holmboe
- 1928–1934: Andreas Didriksen
- 1935–1945: Leif Hartz Floan
- 1946–1955: Øivind Martinussen (Ap)
- 1955–1967: Einar Ytterstad (H)
- 1968–1969: Reidar Rødø (H)
- 1970–1975: Sigvald Johansen (Ap)
- 1975–1983: Gunnar Bernhoft (H)
- 1983–1991: Normann Aasjord (H)
- 1991–1995: Bjørn Myrlund (H)
- 1995–1999: Bjørn Hegstad (V)
- 1999–2003: Eirik Eriksen (Ap)
- 2003–2007: Kurt Olsen (SV)
- 2007–2011: Vibeke Tveit (Ap)
- 2011–2015: Anita Marthinussen (H)
- 2015–2019: Atle Andersen (Ap)
- 2019–present: Hugo Bongard Jacobsen (Ap)

== Attractions ==
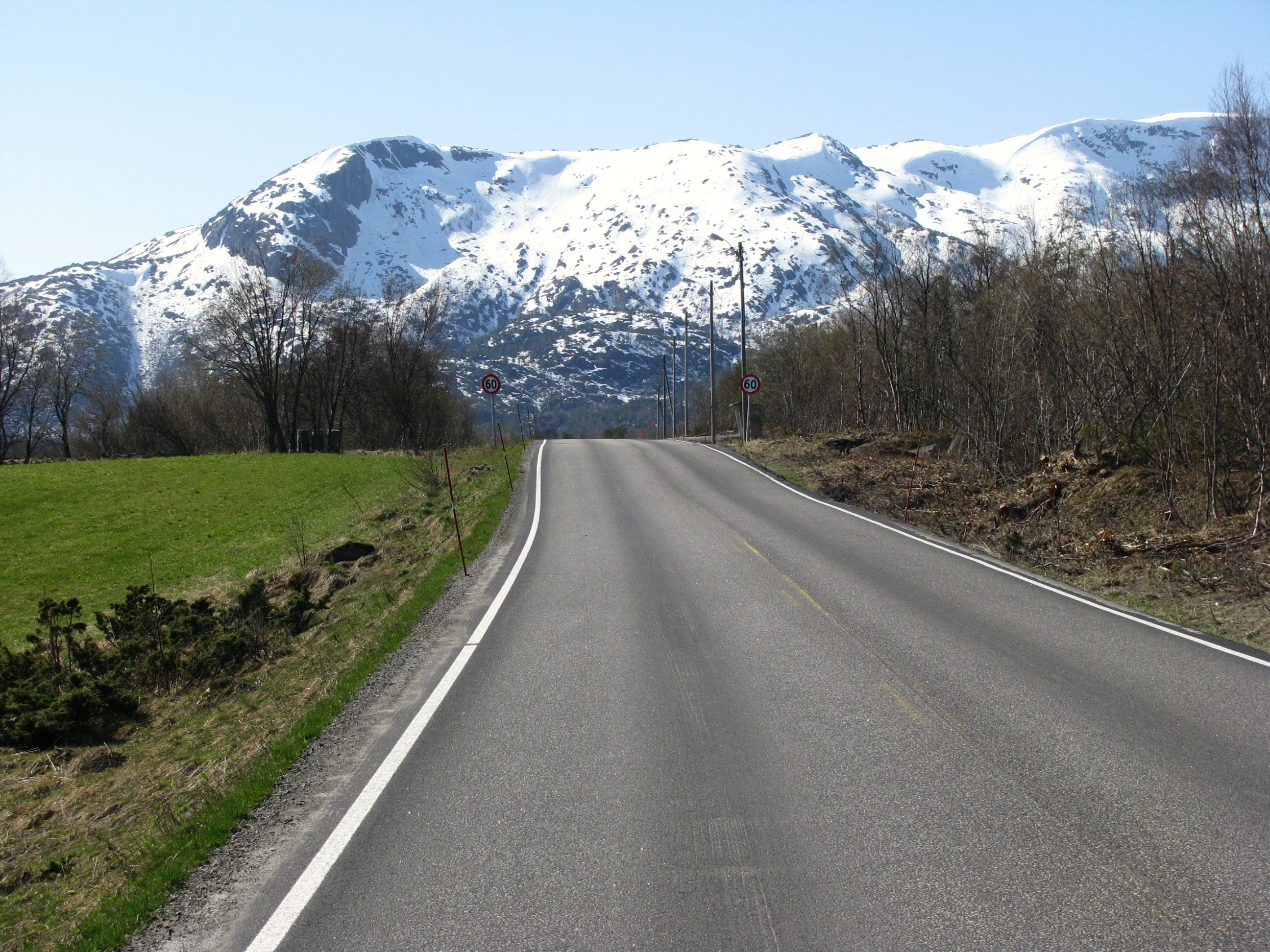
E10 road in Lødingen, May 2011

- Eye in Stone (Øye i stein), part of Artscape Nordland (Skulpturlandskap Nordland)
- Norwegian Telecom Museum, telegraphy
- Pilotage Service Museum
- Rotvær Lighthouse

== Notable people ==
- Christopher Nyrop (1680–1733), a theologian and Bishop of Christianssand
- Dagfinn Bakke (1933–2019), a painter, illustrator and printmaker
- Dagfinn Henrik Olsen (born 1966), a Norwegian politician
