= Lofotposten =

Norwegian newspaper

Lofotposten is a newspaper published in Lofoten, with its headquarters located in Svolvær. It is the biggest publication in Northern Norway. Since 15 May 2020, the newspaper published issues on Tuesdays, Wednesdays, Thursdays and Saturdays.

== History and profile ==
The newspaper was established by Joh. E. Paulsen in 1896. Following the occupation of Norway by Nazis the paper was taken by them in 1941. Since 1995 the newspaper is owned by Amedia. It mainly focuses on the Lofoten area. It had a circulation of 7,133 copies in 2008. Jan Eivind Fredly is the editor.
