= Nanny Hammarström =

Finnish teacher and author

Nanny Matilda Hammarström
- Born: March 23, 1870; Vaasa, Sweden
- Died: December 3, 1953 (aged 83); Loviisa, Finland
- Occupations: Teacher and Author

Nanny Matilda Hammarström (March 23, 1870 – December 3, 1953) was a Finland-Swedish teacher and author.

== Biography ==
Hammarström was born in Vaasa. She taught mathematics, natural history, and geography at schools in Kokkola (1890–1891), Mariehamn (1895–1900), and Loviisa (1900–1943). She was active in a variety of roles in the community and society in Loviisa; she was a member of the town council from 1919 to 1923, and she became the chair of the town library board in 1930.

Hammarström was known in particular as an author of children's books with nature themes. Her eleven books of stories were published in large print runs. She gained an international foothold with her debut work Två myrors äventyr (The Adventures of Two Ants, 1906); the book was translated into Finnish, Norwegian, German, English, and Russian. This was followed, among other works, by Vårvindarnas färd (The Spring Wind's Journey; 1929), a story in which the south wind tells about everything it meets on its journey north. Her books are about the life and interaction of nature and animals, and Hammarström illustrated them herself. In 1979, Två myrors äventyr and Svalparet Hirundo (The Hirundo Swallow Couple, 1915) were republished in new editions. The books Barn och vuxna I–II (Children and Adults I–II, published in 1918 and 1920), are about the author's own family.

Hammarström died in Loviisa, where she is also buried.
