= Lødingen Church =

Church in Nordland, Norway

- Lødingen kirke
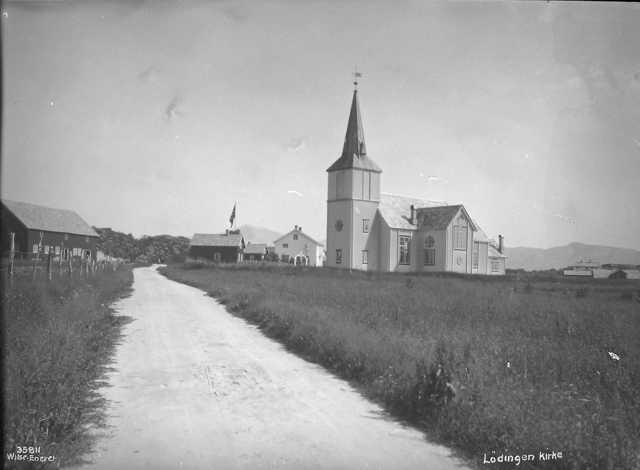
- View of the church
- Lødingen Church
- 68.40633526°N 15.98060265°E
- Location: Lødingen Municipality, Nordland
- Country: Norway
- Denomination: Church of Norway
- Churchmanship: Evangelical Lutheran

History
- Status: Parish church
- Founded: 14th century
- Consecrated: 1897

Architecture
- Functional status: Active
- Architectural type: Cruciform
- Completed: 1897 (129 years ago)

Specifications
- Capacity: 350
- Materials: Wood

Administration
- Diocese: Sør-Hålogaland
- Deanery: Vesterålen prosti
- Parish: Lødingen
- Norwegian Cultural Heritage Site
- Type: Church
- Status: Not protected
- ID: 84358

Lødingen Church (Norwegian: Lødingen kirke) is a parish church of the Church of Norway in Lødingen Municipality in Nordland county, Norway. It is located in the village of Lødingen. It is the main church for the Lødingen parish which is part of the Vesterålen prosti (deanery) in the Diocese of Sør-Hålogaland. The white, wooden church was built in a cruciform style in 1897 using plans drawn up by an unknown architect. The church seats about 350 people.

== History ==
The earliest existing historical records of the church parish date back to 1432, but the church was not new at that time. Not much is known about the early church buildings on the site. The medieval church was a stave church. Around the year 1700, the old stave church was torn down and replaced with a new building. In 1750, the church was described as a log building with a cruciform floor plan and a steeple on the roof. In October 1755, the church was struck by lightning and burned down. A new church was completed the next year. The new church was a timber-framed building with a cruciform floor plan, a small tower over the nave. It also had a sacristy next to the chancel on the east end of the building.

In 1814, this church served as an election church (Norwegian: valgkirke). Together with more than 300 other parish churches across Norway, it was a polling station for elections to the 1814 Norwegian Constituent Assembly which wrote the Constitution of Norway. This was Norway's first national elections. Each church parish was a constituency that elected people called "electors" who later met together in each county to elect the representatives for the assembly that was to meet at Eidsvoll Manor from 10 April to 20 May 1814.

That church stood until 1897, when it was taken down and rebuilt reusing some of the same materials and a similar design. On 1 January 2020, the churches in Lødingen Municipality were transferred from the Ofoten prosti to the Vesterålen prosti.

== Media gallery ==
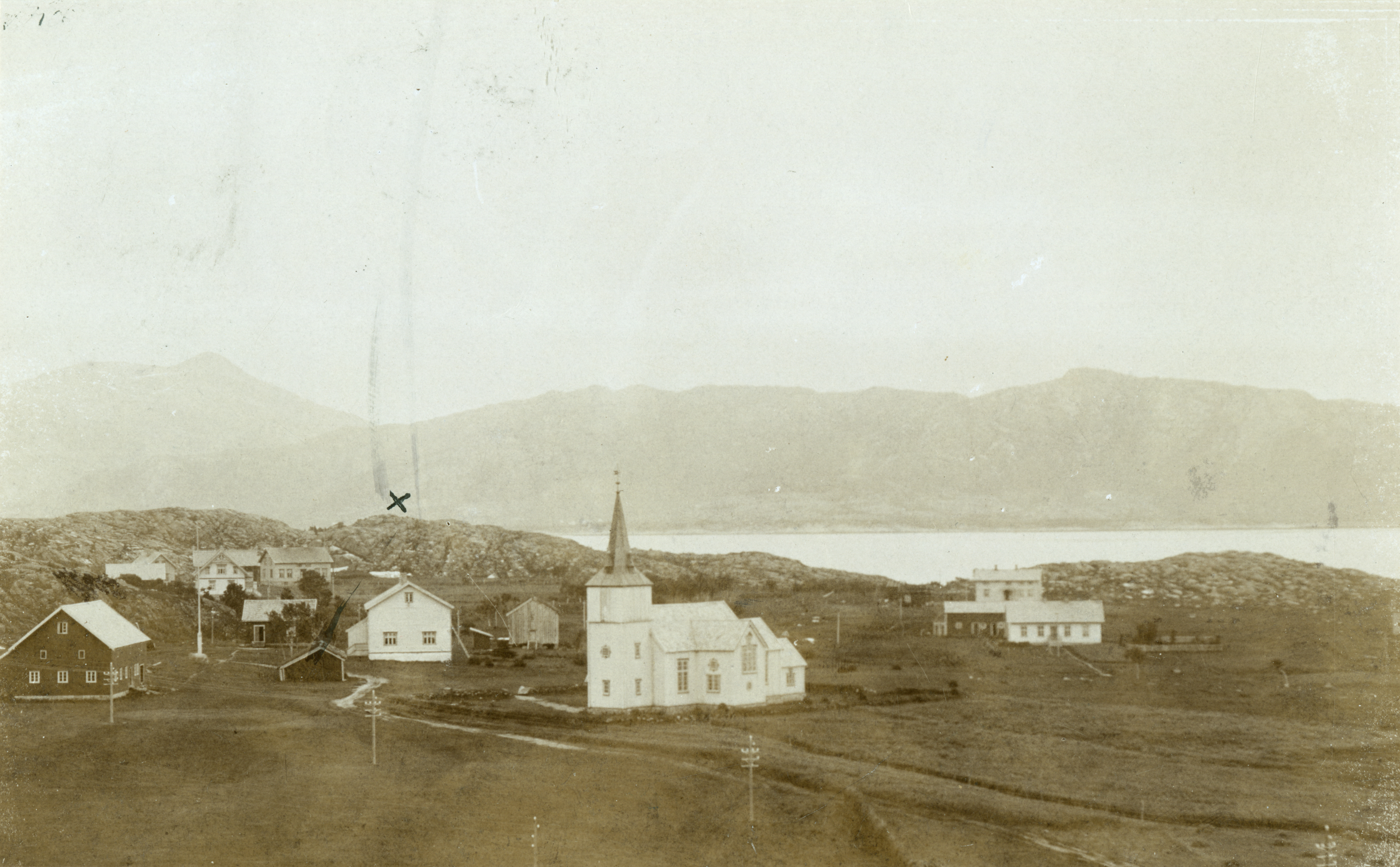

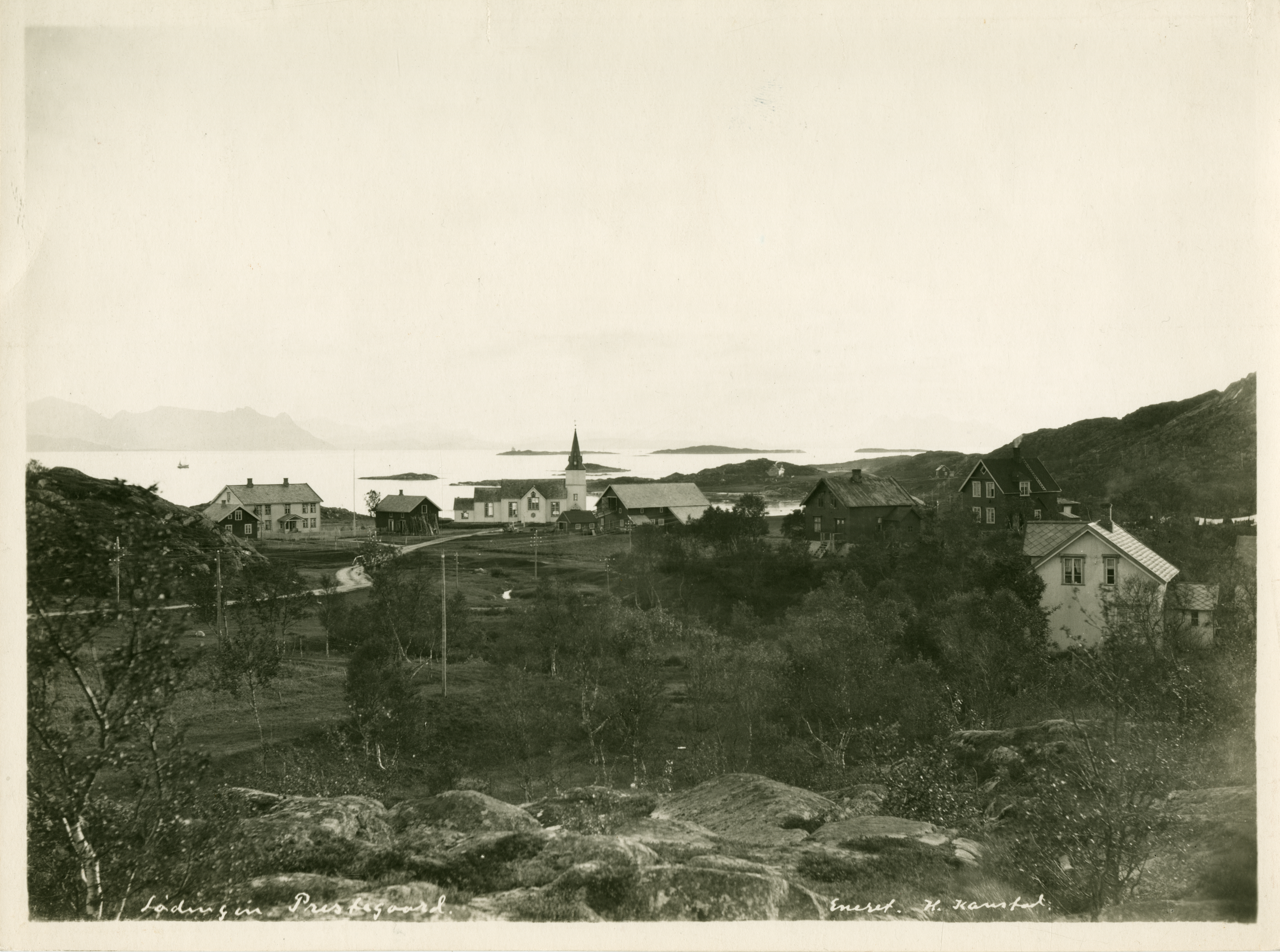

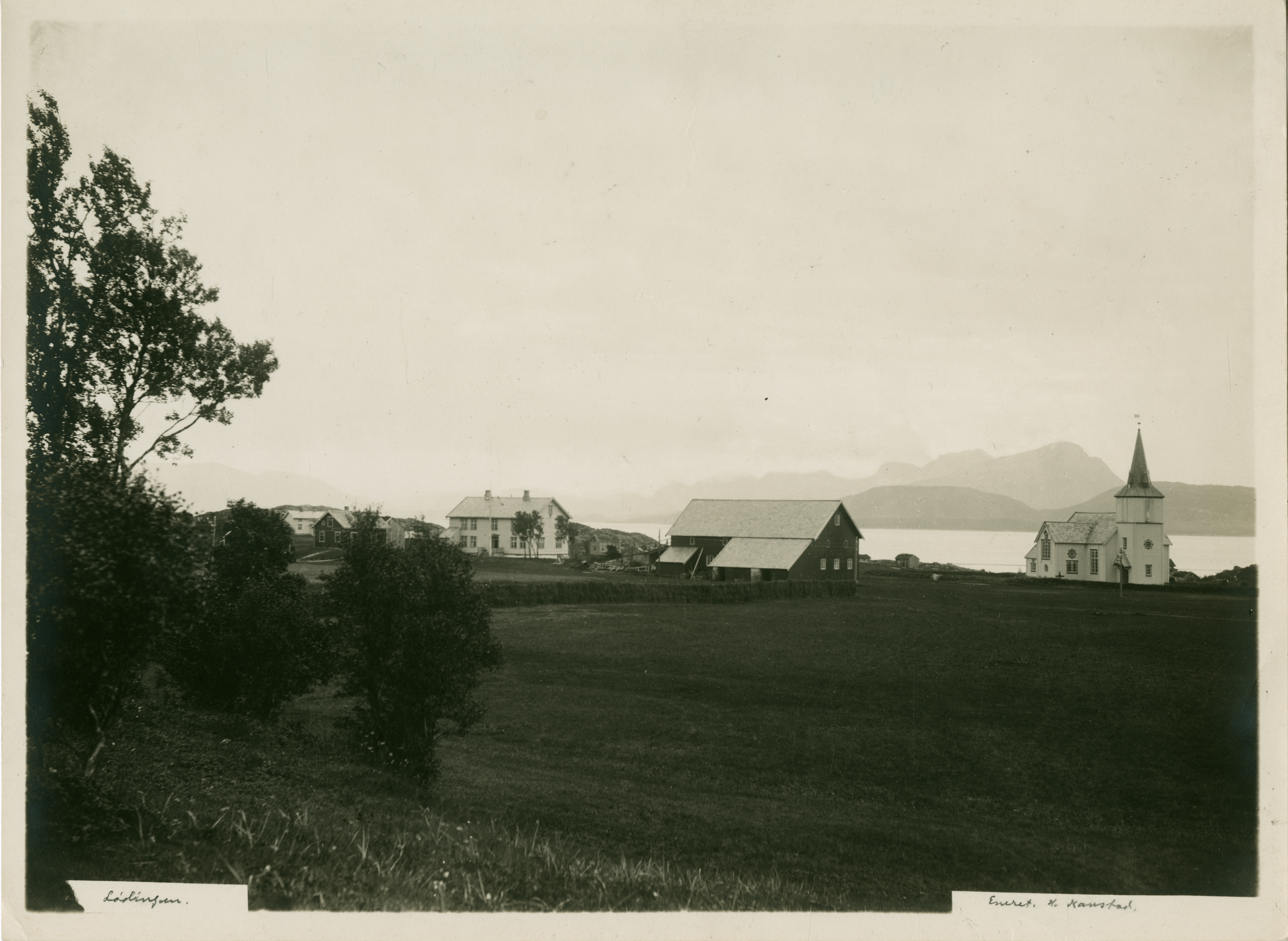

== See also ==
- List of churches in Sør-Hålogaland
