= Lødingen (village) =

Village in Lødingen Municipality, Norway

Lødingen Lodegak (Northern Sami)
- Village
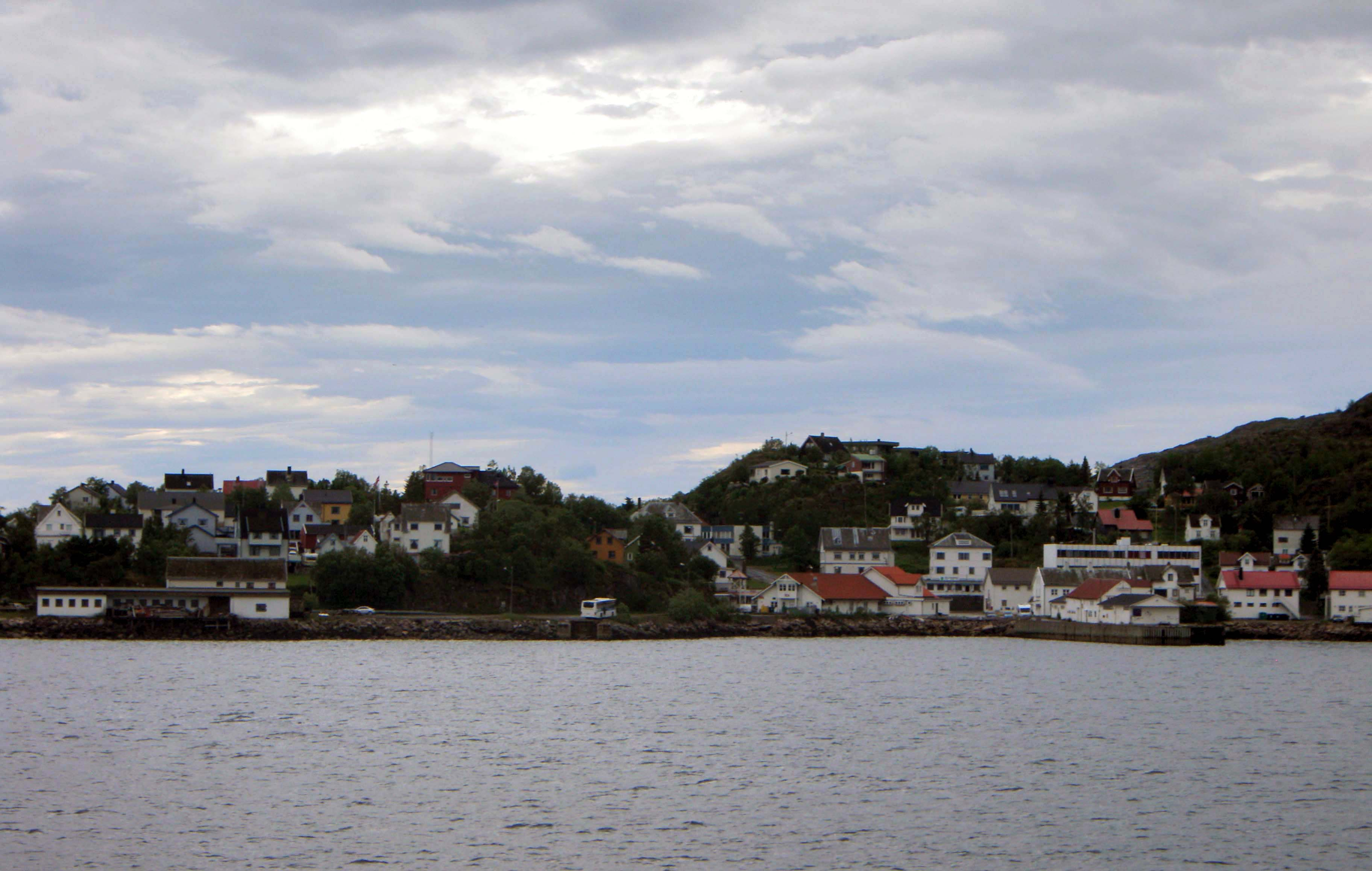
- View of the village
- Interactive map of Lødingen
- Location within Nordland Location within Norway
- Coordinates: 68.4137°N 15.9963°E
- Country: Norway
- Region: Northern Norway
- County: Nordland
- District: Ofoten
- Municipality: Lødingen Municipality

Area
  - Total: 1.33 km^{2} (0.51 sq mi)
- Elevation: 5 m (16 ft)

Population (2023)
  - Total: 1,431
  - Density: 1,076/km^{2} (2,790/sq mi)
- Time zone: UTC+01:00 (CET)
  - Summer (DST): UTC+02:00 (CEST)
- Post Code: 8410 Lødingen

Lødingen (Norwegian; Northern Sami: Lodegak) is the administrative centre of Lødingen Municipality in Nordland county, Norway. The village is located on the southwestern shore of the island of Hinnøya. The village is also located where the southern mouth of the Tjeldsundet strait meets the Vestfjorden.

The 1.33-square-kilometre (330-acre) village has a population (2023) of 1,431 and a population density of 1,076 inhabitants per square kilometre (2,790/sq mi).

The Norwegian National Road 85 runs through the village and continues on the Bognes–Lødingen ferry route. The village is the business and transportation centre for the municipality. It has the municipal government offices, school, Lødingen Church, as well as Norwegian Telemuseum Lødingen, and Lødingen Maritime Museum.

== Etymology ==
The village (and municipality) is named after the old Lødingen farm (Old Norse: Lǫðueng) since the first Lødingen Church was built there. The first element is the genitive case of laða which means "grain barn" or "hay barn". The last element is eng which means "meadow".
