= Umeå Östra station =

Railway station in Umeå, Sweden

Umeå Ö
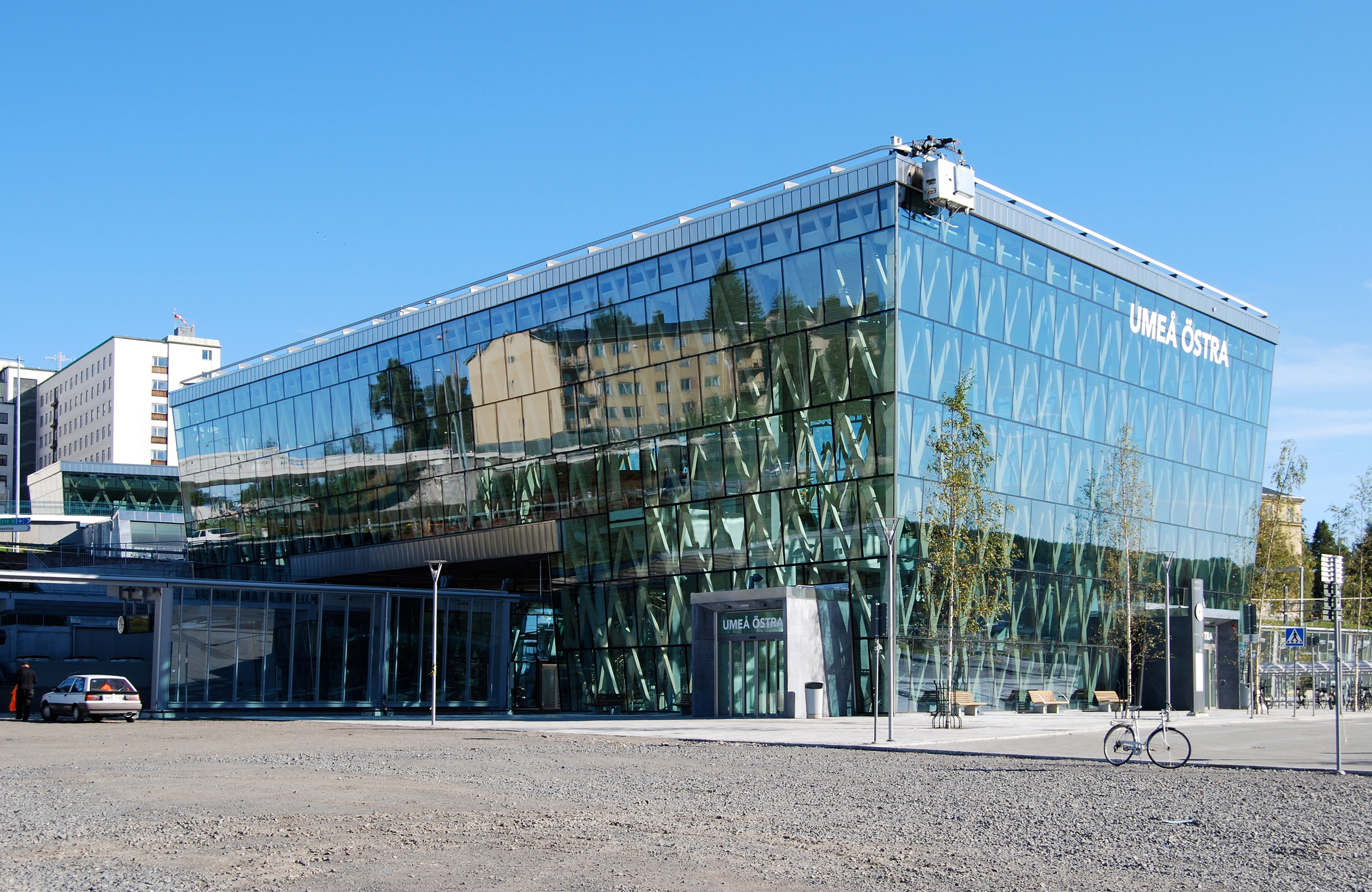

General information
- Location: Umeå, Umeå Municipality; Sweden
- Coordinates: 63°49′03″N 20°17′37″E
- Operator: Trafikverket
- Lines: Bothnia Line, Vännäs–Umeå–Holmsund Railway

Construction
- Architect: Lennart Sjögren

History
- Opened: 7 August 2010; 16 years ago

Services
Preceding station	Norrtåg	Following station
Umeå Central towards Luleå	Main Line Through Upper Norrland	Terminus
Umeå Central towards Lycksele	Lycksele Line	Terminus
Umeå Central towards Vännäs	Vännäs Line	Terminus
Umeå Central Terminus	Bothnia Line	Hörnefors towards Sundsvall C
Preceding station	SJ	Following station
Umeå C Terminus	East Coast Line	Örnsköldsvik Central towards Stockholm C
Preceding station	Vy Tåg	Following station
Umeå Central towards Luleå or Narvik	Night Trains to Upper Norrland	Nordmaling towards Stockholm Central
Location

Umeå Östra station (English: Umeå East station) is a railway station in Umeå, Sweden. The station was opened on 7 August 2010, with King Carl XVI Gustaf officially opening the station on 28 August. It was built in connection with the construction of the Bothnia Line (Botniabanan) to Umeå.

It is one of the two stations serving Umeå, the other being the older Umeå Central Station which is located 2 km to the west. For a year after its opening, Umeå Östra Station was the sole station serving Umeå as Central Station was closed during this time for renovation. Umeå Östra is located close to the Umeå University and the University Hospital of Umeå.

== The Building ==
The blueprint of Umeå Östra Station was proposed by Lennart Sjögren of White arkitekter with NCC AB financing the project. The building itself is mainly consisted of glass and glued laminated timber, and has two floors, with a Café located on floor 2. The accessibility of the station has been heavily prioritised and there are several elevator, escalators and stairs connecting the two subsequent floors. Furthermore, as the glass is non-reflective, trains are visible from almost every corner.

== Services ==
Umeå Östra is the second of two stops in Umeå for up to four daily intercity trains to and from Stockholm Central Station, operated by SJ AB Bombardier Regina X55 trains. SJ also operate a daily night train, with portions to Stockholm and Gothenburg which separate/join in Sundsvall.

In December 2020, Vy Tåg assumed operation of the Swedish Transport Administration state-supported night trains between Stockholm and Norrland, for a period of four years. Two Vy night trains call at Umeå Östra and Umeå Central in each direction every day: one between Narvik, Kiruna and Stockholm and one between Luleå and Stockholm.

Norrtåg provide local and regional rail services south towards Sundsvall, west towards Vännäs (until 2010, the original railway junction between Umeå and the Main Line Through Upper Norrland), north west towards Lycksele and north towards Boden, Luleå and Haparanda.

== Photo gallery ==
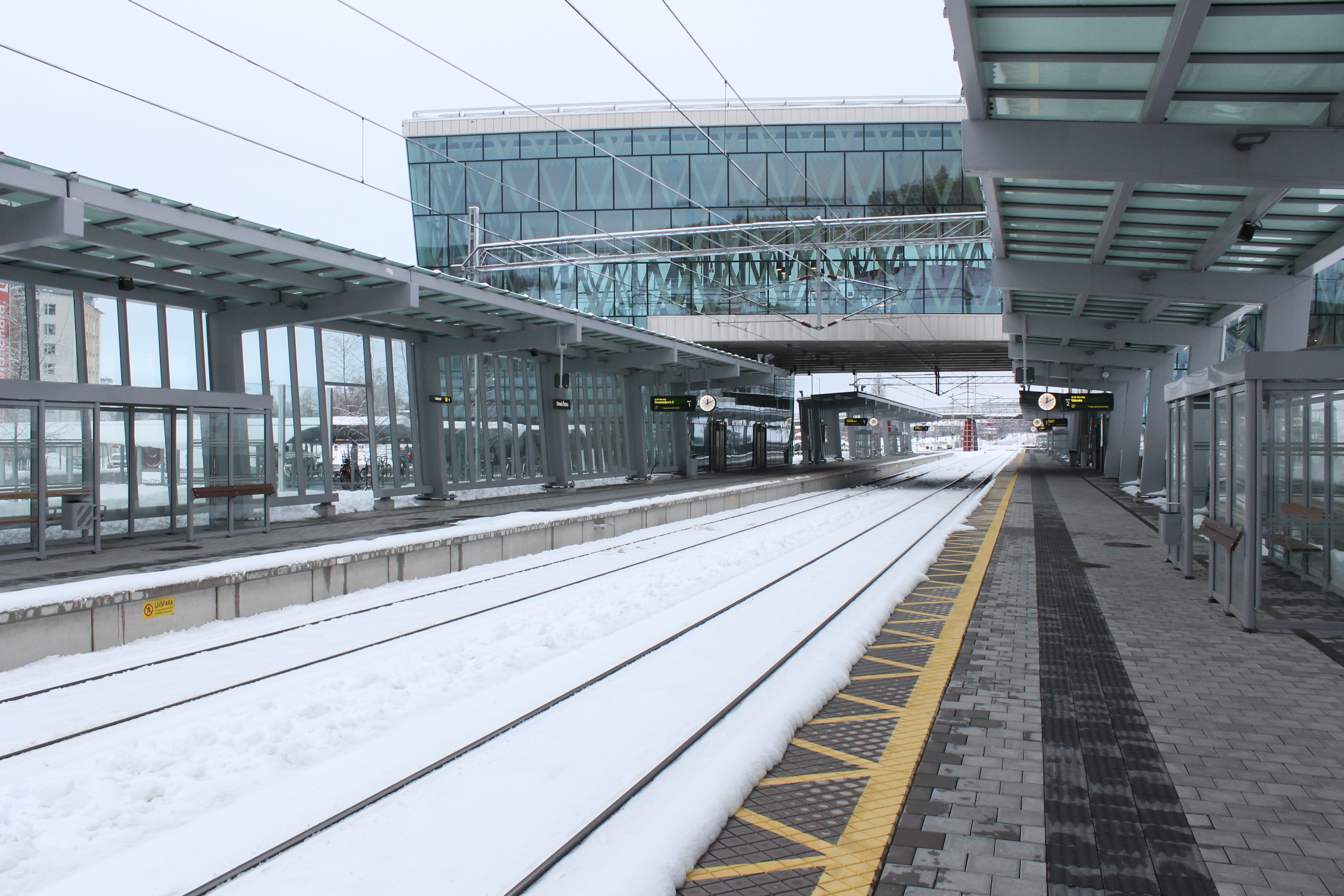
Train platform with the station building in the background

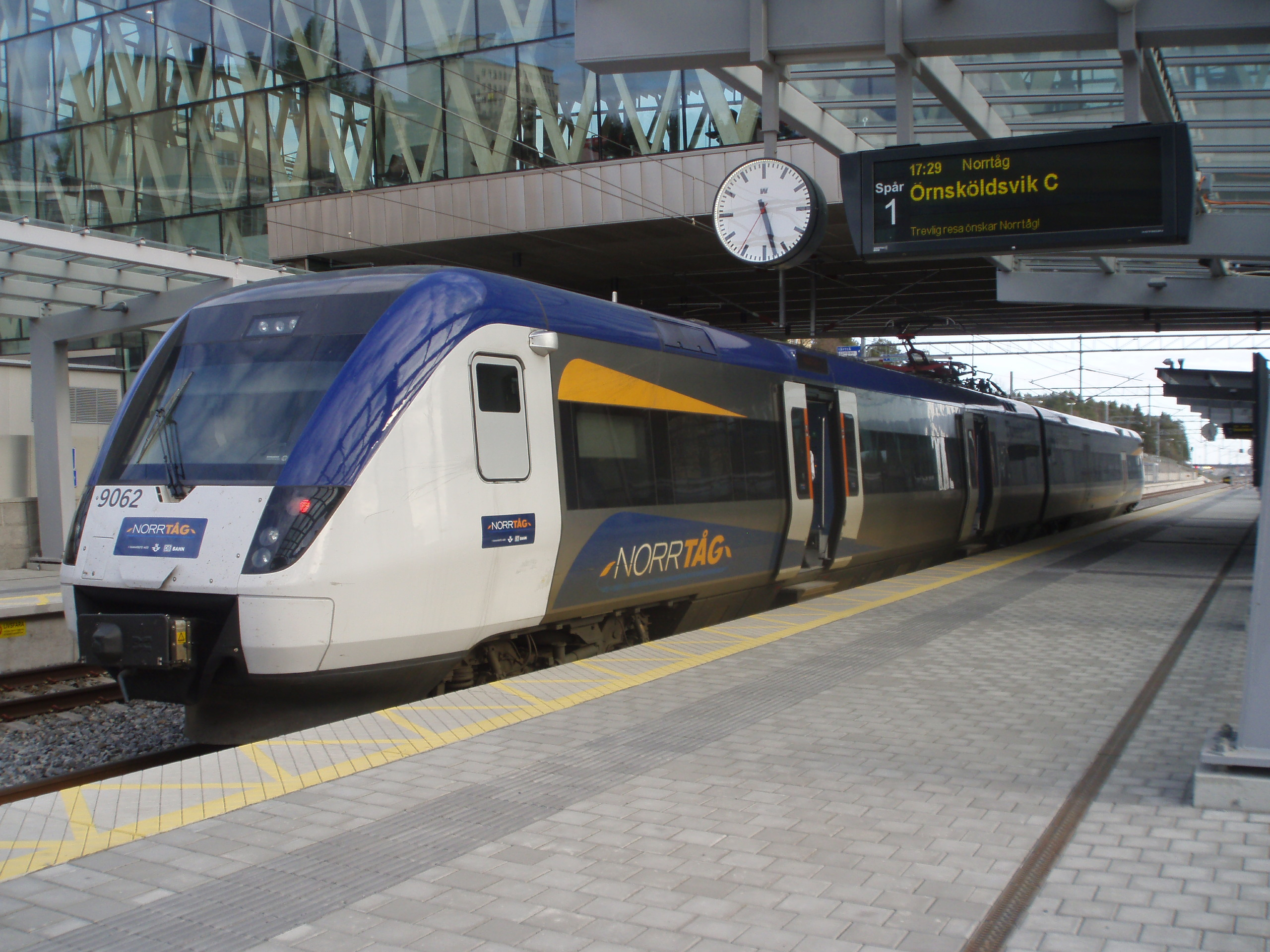
Southbound train

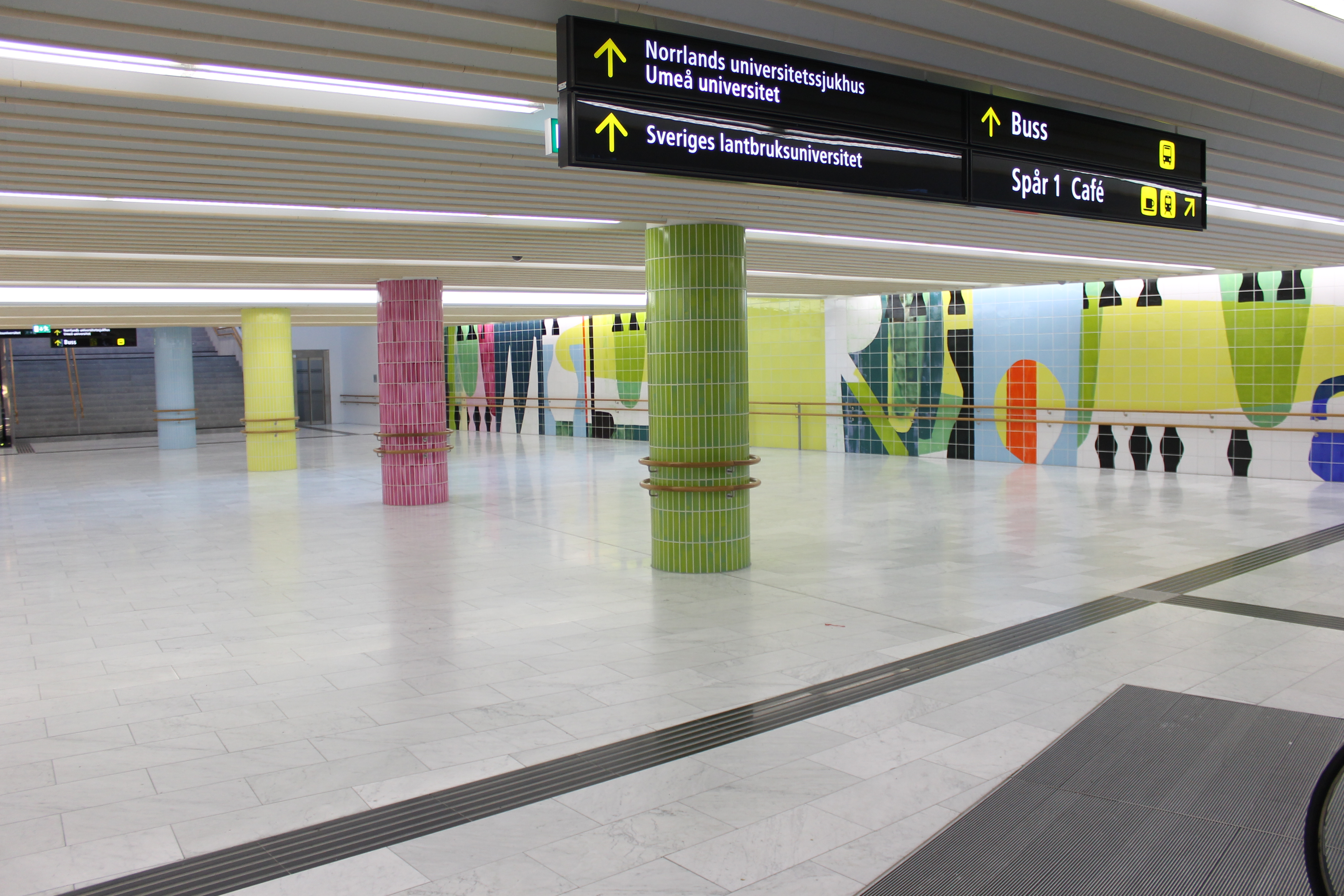
Part of the artwork in the entrance

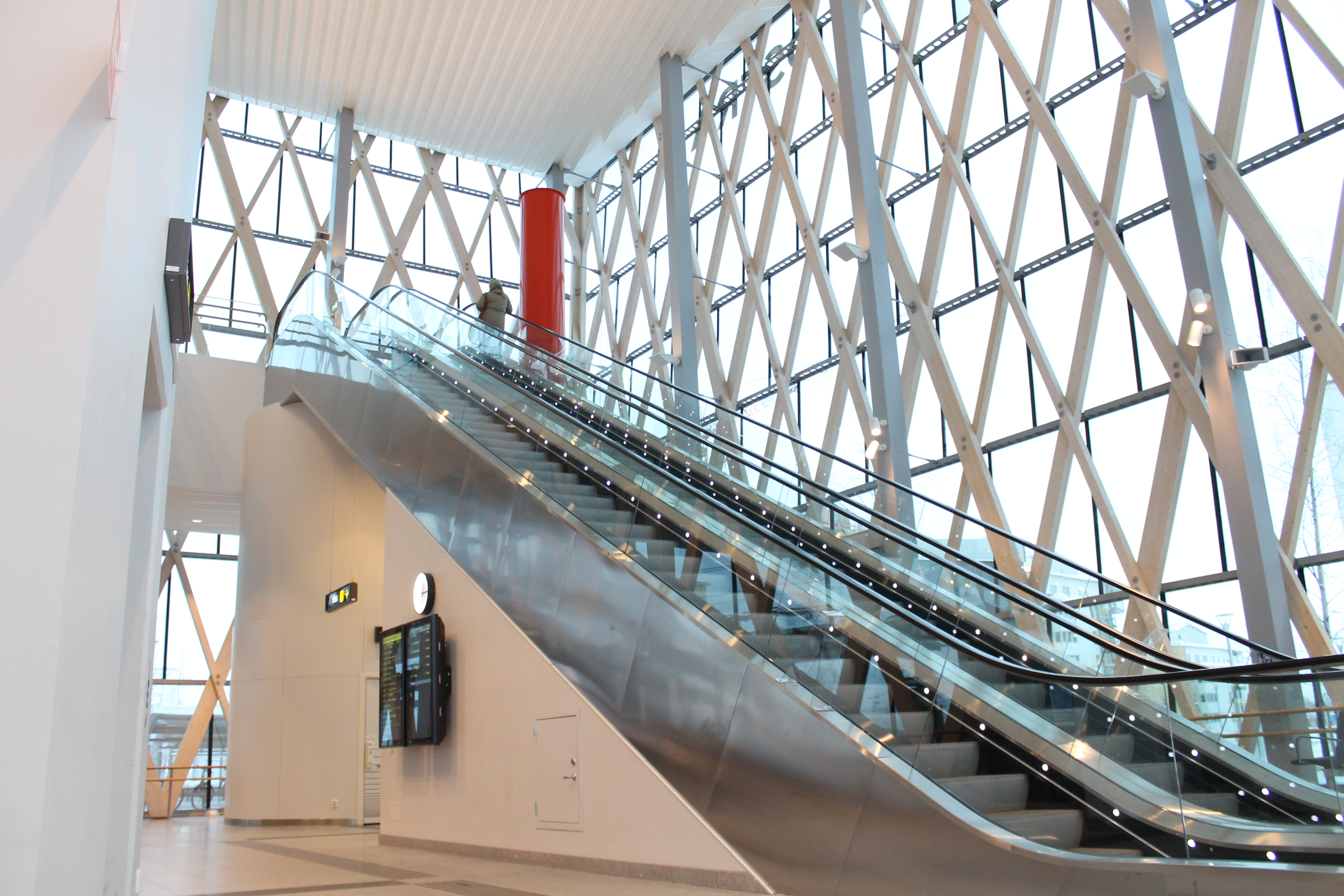
One of the escalators in the building
