= Hörnefors railway station =

Railway station in Umeå, Sweden

Coordinates: 63.6330°N 19.9098°E

Hörnefors station

General information
- Location: Hörnefors, Umeå Municipality; Sweden
- Line(s): Bothnia Line
- Platforms: 1
- Tracks: 1
- Train operators: Norrtåg
- Bus operators: Länstrafiken i Västerbotten

Construction
- Architect: Ivar Bengtsson, Olle Qvarnström

History
- Opened: 2010

Services
Preceding station	Norrtåg	Following station
Umeå East towards Umeå Central	Bothnia Line	Nordmaling towards Sundsvall Central
Location

Hörnefors station (Swedish: Hörnefors station or Hörnefors resecentrum) is a railway station in Hörnefors, Sweden. The station opened in 2010 as part of the new Bothnia Line from Sundsvall to Umeå.
