= Umeå Central Station =

Railway station in Umeå, Sweden

Umeå C
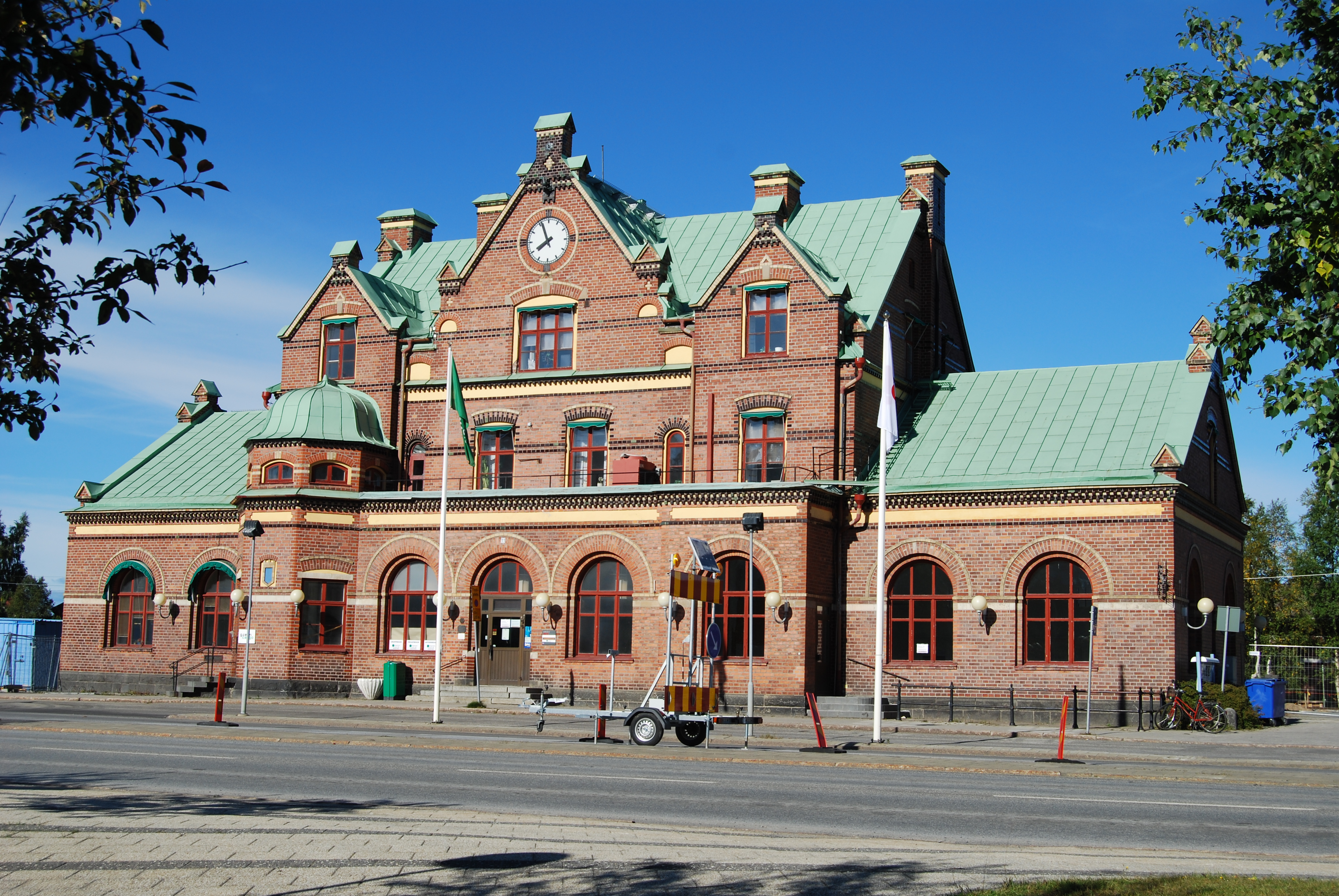

General information
- Location: Umeå, Umeå Municipality; Sweden
- Coordinates: 63°49′50″N 20°16′0″E
- Operator: Trafikverket
- Lines: Vännäs–Umeå–Holmsund, Bothnia Line

Construction
- Architect: Folke Zettervall

History
- Opened: 1896; 130 years ago

Services
Preceding station	Norrtåg	Following station
Vännäsby towards Luleå	Main Line Through Upper Norrland	Umeå Ö Terminus
Vännäsby towards Lycksele	Lycksele Line	Umeå Ö Terminus
Vännäsby towards Vännäs	Vännäs Line	Umeå Ö Terminus
Terminus	Bothnia Line	Umeå Ö towards Sundsvall C
Preceding station	SJ	Following station
Terminus	East Coast Line	Umeå East towards Stockholm C
Vindeln towards Luleå or Narvik	Night Trains to Upper Norrland	Umeå East towards Stockholm C
Location

Umeå Central Station (Swedish: Umeå centralstation or Umeå C) is a railway station in Umeå, Sweden.

The station was the sole station serving Umeå until the opening of Umeå East Station in 2010. Renovation of Central station was completed the following year.

== History ==
The station was designed by architect Folke Zettervall and built 1895–96. In 2001, it was declared a listed building.

With the construction of the Bothnia Line, Umeå Central Station was rebuilt from July 2010 until November 2012, with a new pedestrian and bicycle tunnel built under the tracks. A new 175 metre long platform was built on the north (Haga) side of the station and the existing platform on the south (city centre) side of the station was extended to 455 meters. The station building was renovated at the same time. The adjacent Järnvägstorget and Bangatan were renovated in 2013.

== Services ==
Umeå Central station is the terminus for up to four daily high-speed trains to and from Stockholm Central Station, operated by SJ AB Bombardier Regina X55 trains. SJ also operate a daily night train, with portions to Stockholm and Gothenburg which separate/join in Sundsvall.

In December 2020, Vy Tåg assumed operation of the Swedish Transport Administration state-supported night trains between Stockholm and Norrland, for a period of four years. Two Vy night trains call at Umeå in each direction every day: one between Narvik, Kiruna and Stockholm and one between Luleå and Stockholm.

Norrtåg provide local and regional rail services south towards Sundsvall, west towards Vännäs (until 2010, the original railway junction between Umeå and the Main Line Through Upper Norrland), north west towards Lycksele and north towards Boden, Luleå and Haparanda.

== Photo gallery ==
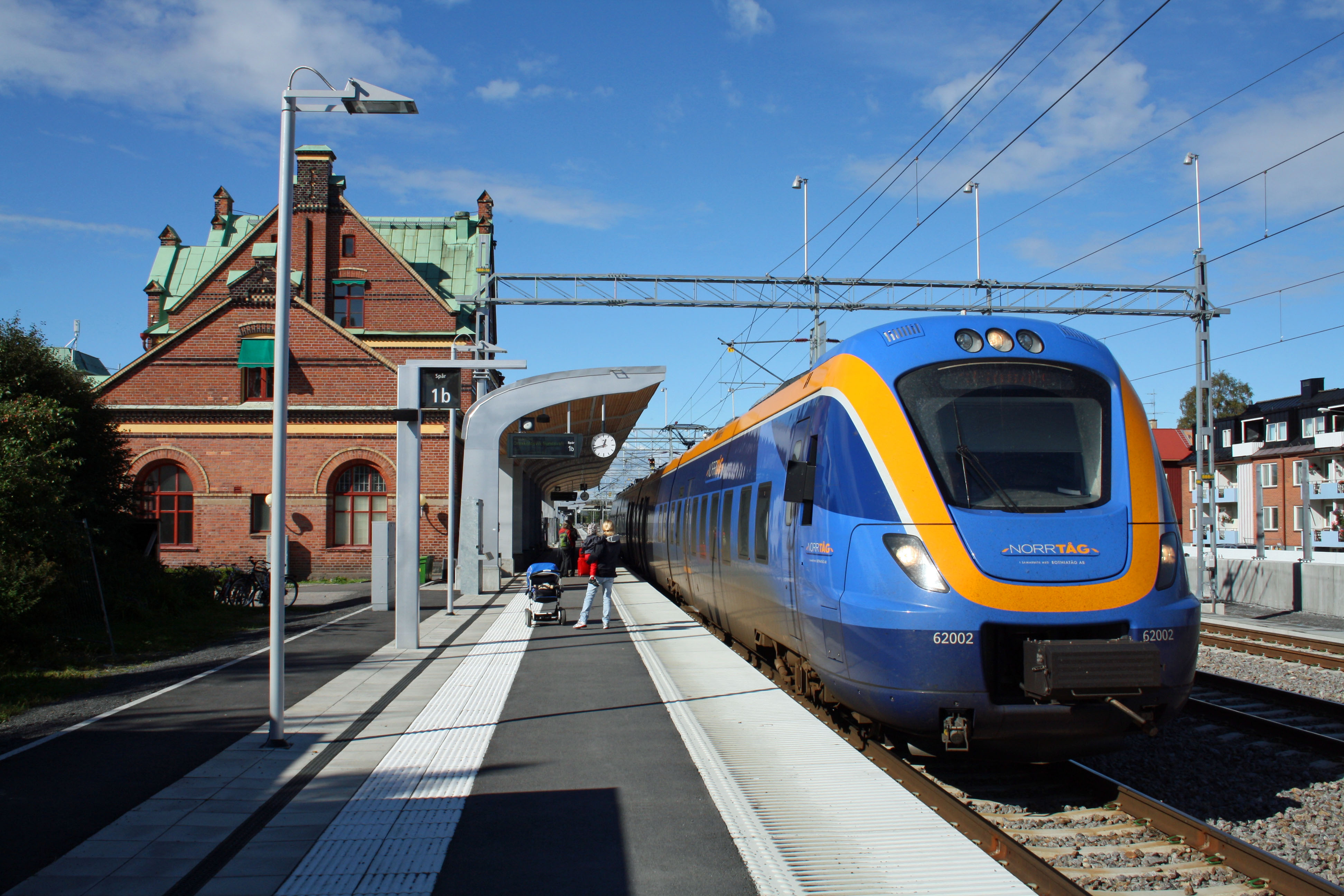
Norrtåg X62 train at the station

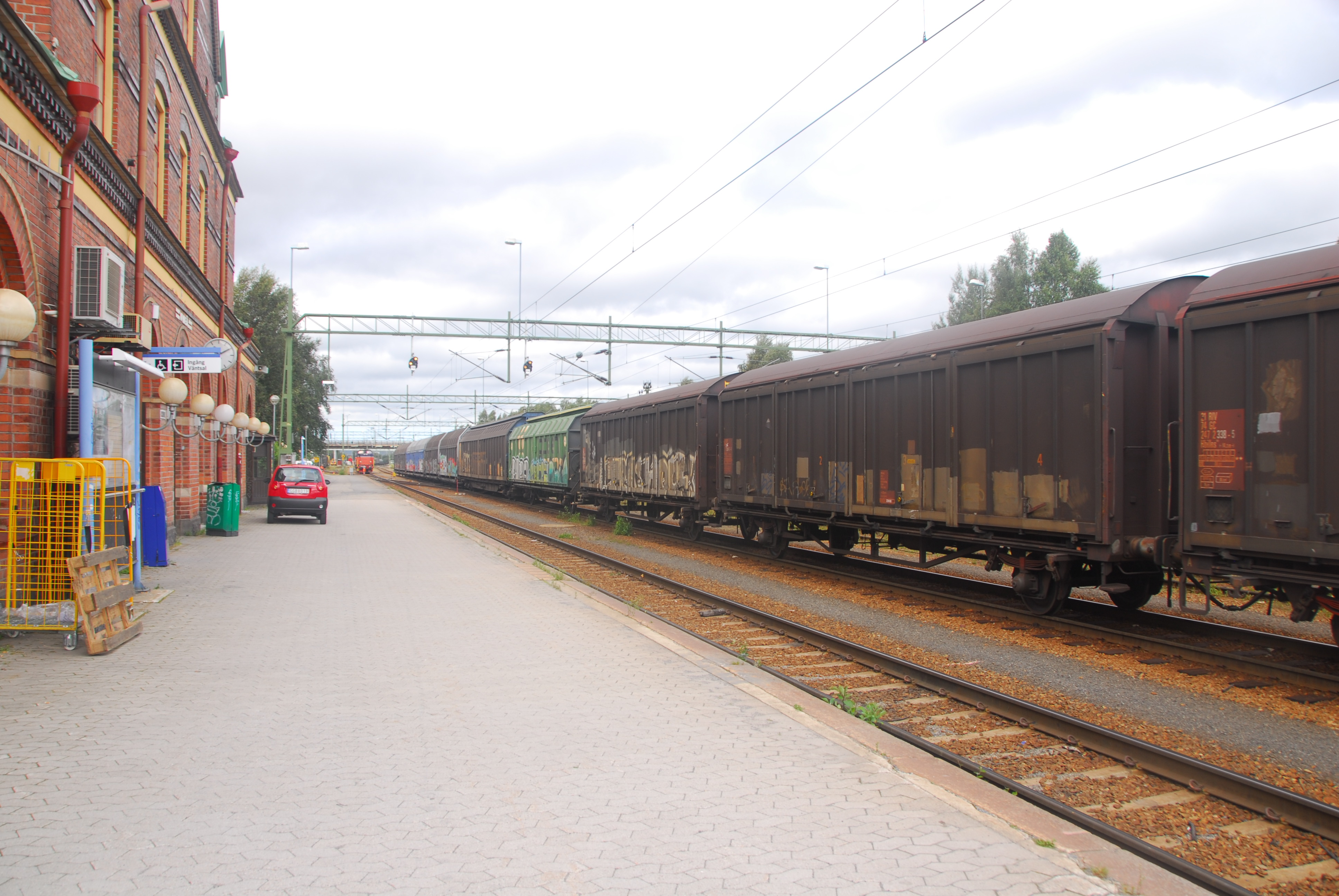
Umeå Central Station (before redevelopment).

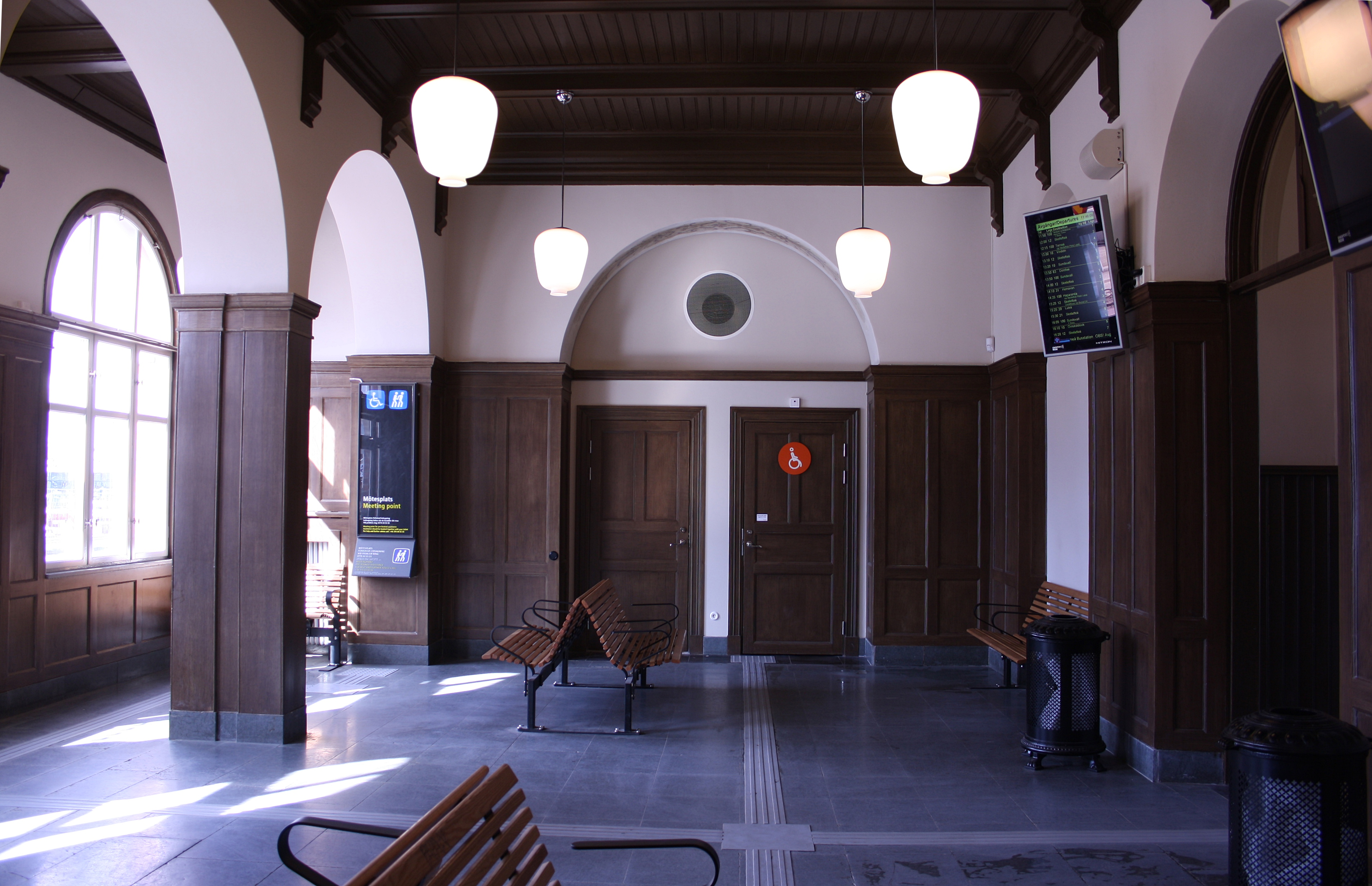
The inside of the station
