= Vännäs railway station =

Railway station in Sweden

Coordinates: 63°54′31″N 19°45′01″E

Vännäs station
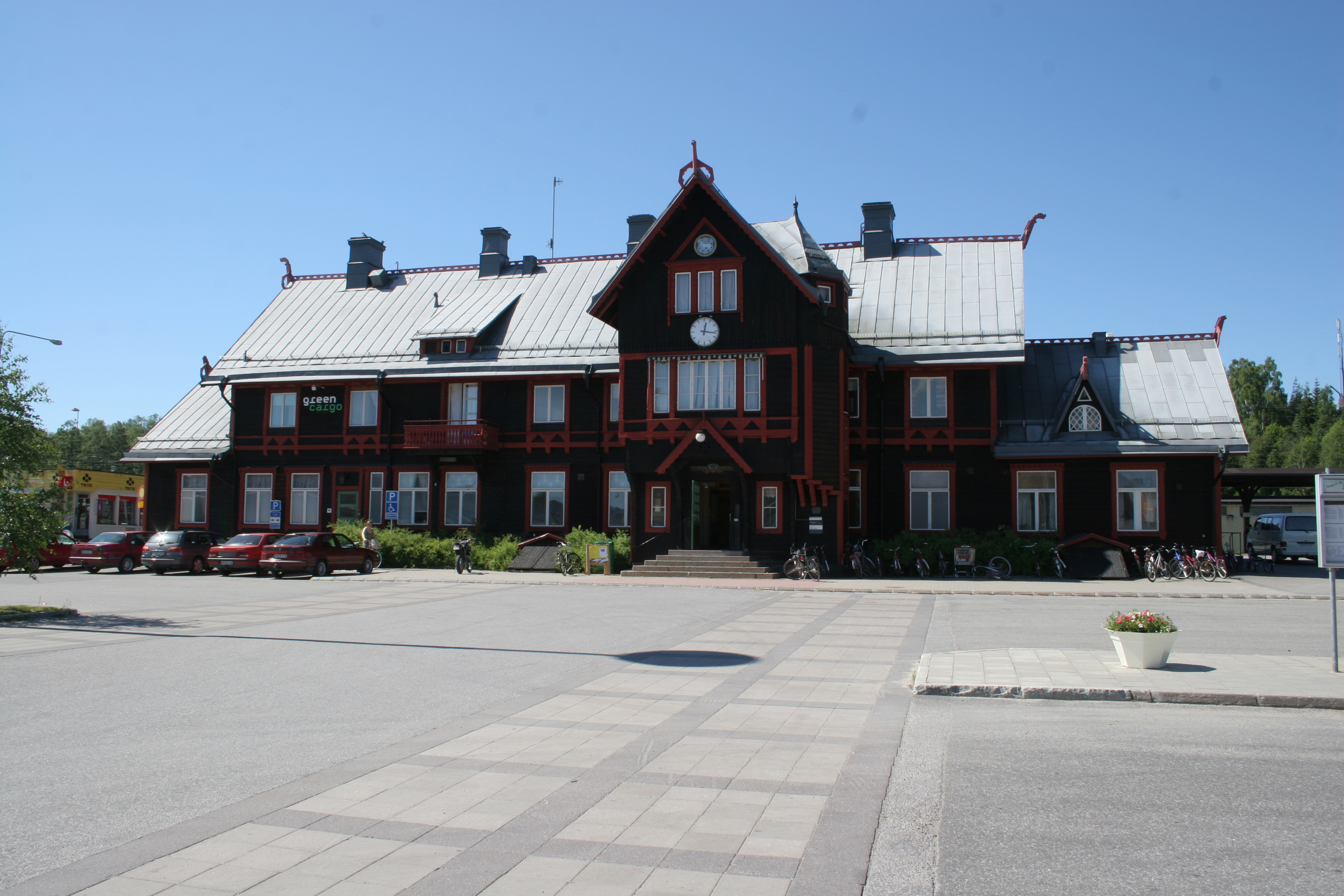
- Vännäs station building, seen from the east.

General information
- Location: Vännäs, Vännäs Municipality; Sweden
- Lines: Main Line Through Upper Norrland, Vännäs–Umeå–Holmsund Railway
- Platforms: 2
- Tracks: 3
- Train operators: Norrtåg

Other information
- Station code: Vns

History
- Opened: 1896

Services
Preceding station	Norrtåg	Following station
Terminus	Vännäs Line	Vännäsby towards Umeå Ö
Tvärålund towards Lycksele	Lycksele Line	Vännäsby towards Umeå Ö
Tvärålund towards Luleå	Main Line Through Upper Norrland	Vännäsby towards Umeå Ö
Location

Vännäs station (Swedish: Vännäs järnvägsstation) is a railway station in Vännäs, Västerbotten, Sweden.

== History ==
The Main Line Through Upper Norrland was built at the end of the 19th century, with the station in Vännäs opening in 1891. Five years later in 1896, the branch line from Vännäs to Umeå and the coastal port of Holmsund was inaugurated, making Vännäs an important railway junction between the main line and the coast. Prior to the opening of the Bothnia Line in 2010, all passengers trains between Norrland and the south of Sweden passed through Vännäs, usually with connecting trains or carriages being detached or attached for Umeå.

== Services ==
Today, passenger services are provided by Norrtåg, with approximately hourly trains to and from Umeå Central Station and Umeå East Station. There is one additional weekday service to and from Vindeln, Hällnäs and Lycksele.

Long-distance night trains operated by Vy Tåg occasionally stop at Vännäs station when engineering works or other disruptions prevent them from using the Bothnia Line through Umeå.

== See also ==
- Railway Transport in Sweden
