= Sundsvall Central Station =

Railway station in Sundsvall, Sweden

Coordinates: 62.3867°N 17.3156°E

Sundsvall C
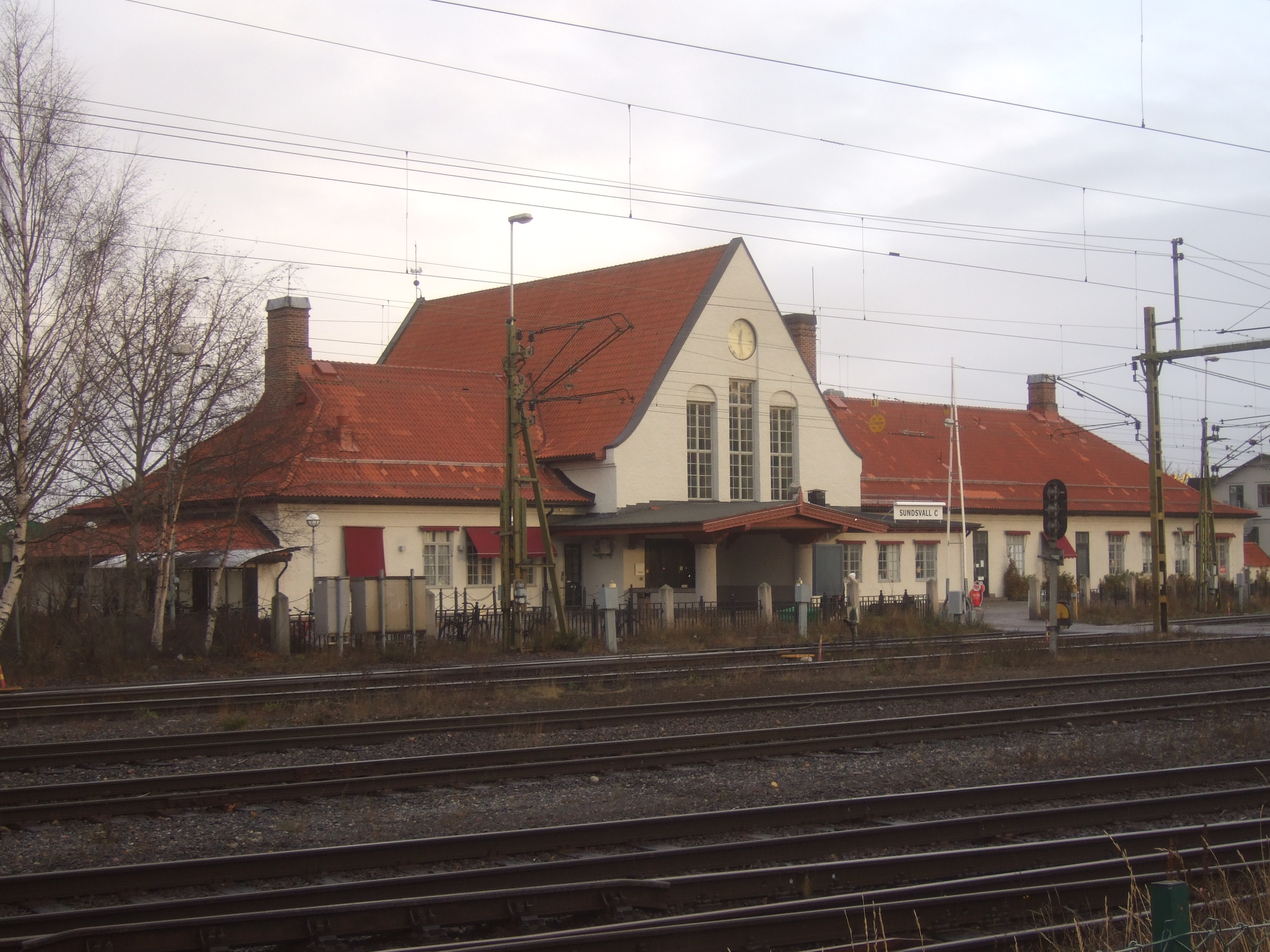
- View of the station.

General information
- Location: Sundsvall, Sundsvall Municipality; Sweden
- Owner: Jernhusen
- Lines: Ådalen Line; Central Line; East Coast Line
- Platforms: 2
- Tracks: 4
- Train operators: Norrtåg; SJ; Vy Tåg; X-Tåget

Construction
- Architect: Folke Zettervall

Other information
- Station code: Suc

History
- Opened: 1925
Location

The Sundsvall Central Station (Swedish: Sundsvalls centralstation) is a railway station in Sundsvall, Sweden. It was designed by architect Folke Zettervall and opened December 17, 1925. There was a nearby predecessor built in 1874 for Sundsvall–Torpshammar Railway (today's Central Line), still remaining as a building. The 1925 station was built for the opening of the East Coast Line.

The station is owned by Jernhusen.

== Services ==
Preceding station	Norrtåg	Following station
Sundsvall West towards Umeå Central	Bothnia Line	Terminus
Sundsvall West towards Storlien	Central Line	Terminus
Preceding station	SJ	Following station
Härnösand towards Umeå C	East Coast Line	Hudiksvall towards Stockholm C
Härnösand towards Luleå or Narvik	Night Trains to Upper Norrland	Hudiksvall towards Stockholm C
Preceding station	X-Tåget	Following station
Sundsvall West Terminus	East Coast Line Sundsvall–Gävle	Gnarp towards Gävle Central

== Sundsvall West Station ==
Sundsvall West is a smaller station located 1.3 km (0.9 mi) west of the Central station, serving the western side of midtown Sundsvall with Sundsvall University. It is an endpoint for regional trains from Gävle, and is served by regional trains towards Umeå and Jämtland as well.
