= Norrtåg =

Swedish rail transport company

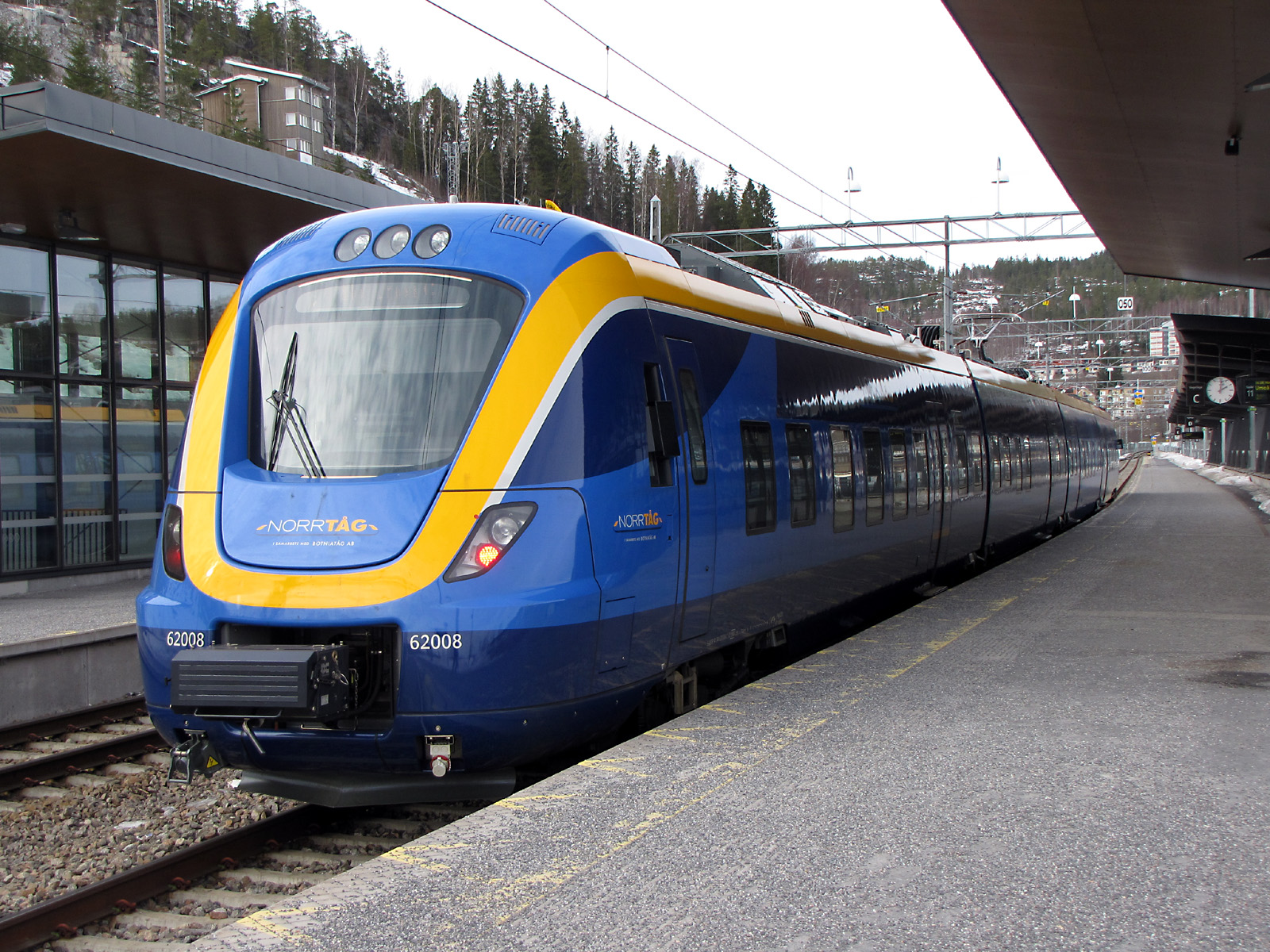
- An X62 EMU at Örnsköldsvik Central Station

Overview
- Operator: VR Sverige
- Main regions: Iron Ore Line; Upper Norrland; Bothnia and Ådalen lines Central Line
- Other region: Hällnäs - Storuman railway
- Fleet: 12 X62 Coradia; 4 X52 Regina; 3 X11 Class units 1 Y31 Itino
- Stations called at: 82
- Parent company: Regional public transport authorities of Norrbotten, Västerbotten, Västernorrland and Jämtland counties
- Reporting mark: NTAB
- Dates of operation: 29 May 2001 (company founded); 30 August 2010 (began operation)–
- Predecessor: SJ Intercity services between Umeå - Luleå

Other
- Website: www.norrtag.se
Route map

Norrtåg (English: Northern Trains) is a publicly owned company which is owned by Norrbotten County, Västerbotten County, Västernorrland County and Jämtland County in Sweden. The company owns passenger trains and organises passenger train operation. Norrtåg controls ticket sales and contracts an operator which handles actual train operation (staff and permits). The trains are operated under the brand name Norrtåg.

Norrtåg started operation in 2010 on the newly opened Botnia line, and in 2011 it took over the until then branded Mittnabotåget services. Trains were operated by Botniatåg (an SJ AB / DB Regio joint venture) until 20 August 2016, when Tågkompaniet (now Vy Tåg) took over operations.

Norrtåg services currently serve 82 stations with a total of 41 daily return trains reaching a total distance of 1,781 km.

== Services ==
The following routes are operated under the current Norrtåg transport agreement.

Iron Ore Line
Route	tpd	Calling at	Class
Luleå C to Kiruna	5	Notviken, Sunderby Sjukhus, Boden C, Murjek, Nattavaara, Gällivare, Kaitum, Fjällåsen, Sjisjka (request)	X52
Haparanda Line
Route	tpd	Calling at	Class
Luleå C to Haparanda	3	Notviken, Sunderby Sjukhus, Boden C, Kalix; Some trains from both ends turn short at Boden Central on weekends	X52
Upper Norrland Main Line
Route	tpd	Calling at	Class
Umeå East to Luleå C	3	Umeå C, Vännäsby, Vännäs, Vindeln, Hällnäs, Bastuträsk, Jörn, Älvsbyn, Boden C, Sunderby Sjukhus, Notviken	X52
Umeå East to Vindeln	8	Umeå C, Vännäsby, Vännäs, Tvärålund	X11, X52
Bothnia and Ådalen Lines
Route	tph	Calling at	Class
Umeå C to Sundsvall C	0,5	Umeå East, Hörnefors, Nordmaling, Husum, Örnsköldsvik North, Örnsköldsvik C, Höga Kusten Airport, Kramfors, Härnösand, Timrå, Sundsvall West; Rush-hour infills Umeå–Örnsköldsvik	X52, X62
Central Line
Route	tpd	Calling at	Class
Sundsvall C to Storlien	9	Sundvall West, Stöde, Ånge, Bräcke, Gällö, Pilgrimstad, Brunflo, Östersund C, Östersund West, Krokom, Åre, Duved, Ånn, Enafors; Not all trains travel the full distance	X62

The Sundsvall - Umeå - Kiruna/Luleå corridor is also served by two daily sleeper services to/from Stockholm and Gothenburg respectively. The Central line route also carries SJ High Speed and intercity services between Ånge and Östersund/Storlien, as well as overnight services operated by SJ under public service obligation.

Following the suspension of service to Lycksele in 2022, the formerly separate (electric) commuter service to Vännäs was extended to Vindeln.

== Rolling stock ==
The Norrtåg network is operated with the following trains as of the 2018 timetable.

Norrtåg fleet
Class	Picture	Type	Max speed		Cars	Fleet size	Line(s) served
Class	Picture	Type	km/h	mph	Cars	Fleet size	Line(s) served
X11	X11 electric multiple unit	EMU	140	90	2	3	Umeå East - Vännäs weekday commuter services Secondary rolling stock for Regina
X52E-2 Regina	X52 Regina electric multiple unit	EMU	200	125	2	4	Upper Norrland Main Line Bothnia line Iron Ore Line (Luleå to Kiruna services)
X62 Coradia Nordic	X62 Coradia electric multiple unit	EMU	180	110	4	12	Bothnia and Ådalen lines Weekend services Umeå - Hällnäs
Y31 Itino	Y31 Itino diesel railcar	DMU	140	90	2	1	Umeå to Lycksele line Suspended indefinitely since 2022

Norrtåg's trains are leased from transregional rolling stock operator Transitio and maintained at the purpose-built depot at Umeå freight yard. Two additional Regina sets were cascaded from Uppsala following the introduction of ER1 class Stadler Dosto units on their regional network, in preparation for services on the Haparanda line.
