= Main line through Upper Norrland =

Railway line in Sweden

Main Line Through Upper Norrland
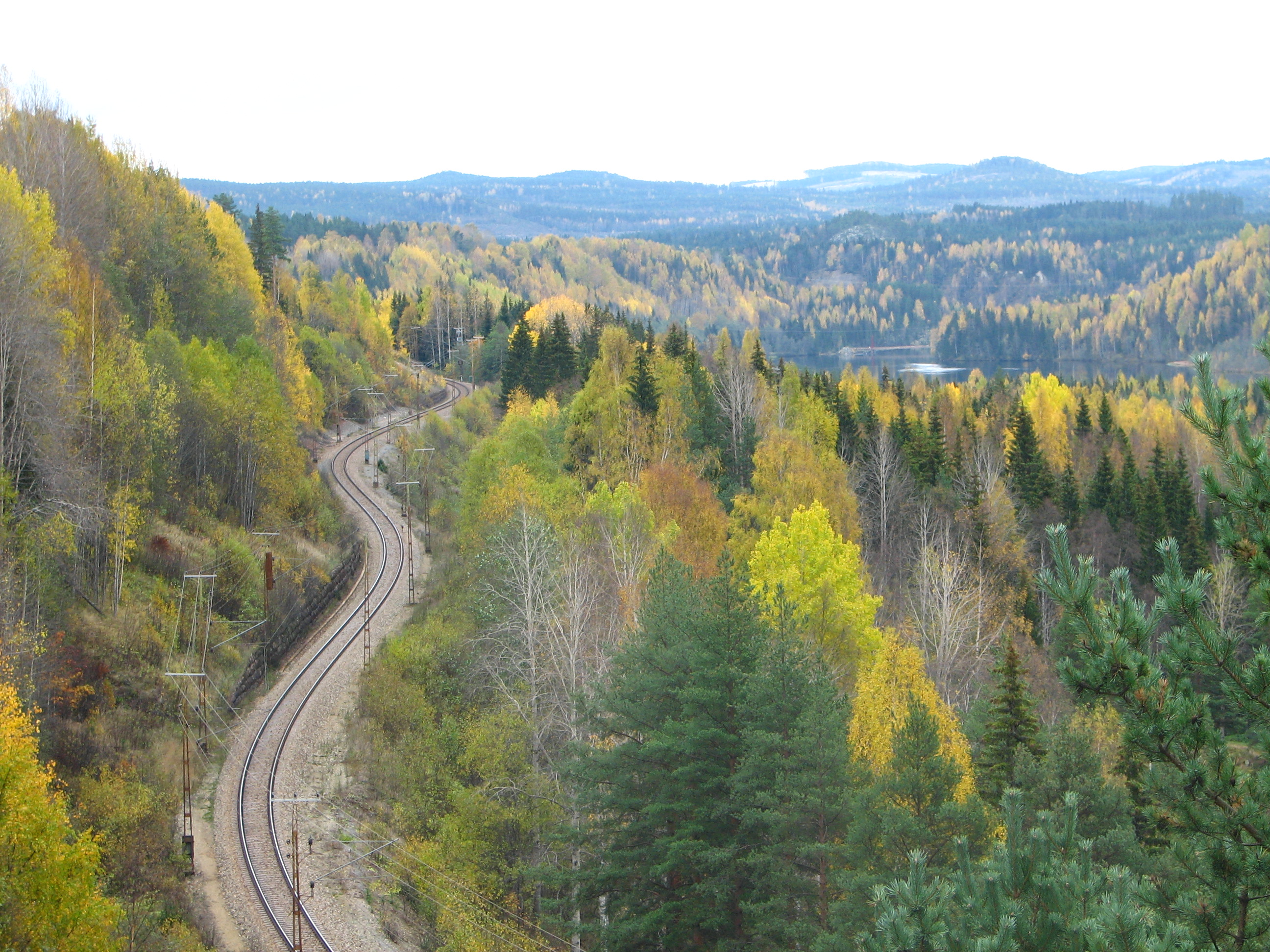
- The railway line at Döda fallet in northern Sweden

Overview
- Owner: Trafikverket
- Termini: Bräcke; Boden

Service
- Type: Railway
- System: Swedish railway

History
- Opened: 1894

Technical
- Line length: 626 km (389 mi)
- Number of tracks: 1
- Character: Mostly freight
- Track gauge: 1,435 mm (4 ft 8 1/2 in)
- Electrification: 15 kV 16.7 Hz AC
- Operating speed: 160 km/h (100 mph)

The Main Line Through Upper Norrland (Swedish: Stambanan genom övre Norrland) is a 626-kilometre (389 mi) long railway line between Bräcke, Jämtland County and Boden, Norrbotten County in Sweden. For military and regional policy reasons, it was built in very sparsely populated areas, far away from the more densely populated coast. The line has several branches to settlements on the coast, the ones to Umeå and Luleå being considered part of the line itself. Today the three largest settlements along the line are Boden (population 18,800), Älvsbyn (population 5,500) and Vännäs (population 4,100).

In 2010, the Bothnia Line opened, which parallels the Main Line Through Upper Norrland along the coast from Sundsvall to Umeå. From 2013 all passenger traffic moved from the Main Line to the Bothnia Line, ending service between along the section between Bräcke and Vännäs. The North Bothnia Line is currently under construction and will in a future allow high-speed trains to run to Luleå.

== History ==
On 28 February 1942, a special train was sent from Stockholm to Boden to celebrate the line's full electrification. It culminated in a celebratory ceremony and a speech by Crown Prince Gustaf Adolf at Överluleå Church, who had boarded the train at Bastuträsk.

== Services ==
The line is dominated by freight traffic, mostly hauled by electric locomotives. Two passenger night trains to and from Stockholm Central Station, operated by Vy Tåg to Swedish Transport Administration specification, travel along part of the railway between Umeå and Boden. One train continues to Narvik in Norway and one continues to Luleå.

Norrtåg provide up to three daily trains per direction between Umeå, Boden and Luleå, with one continuing to/from Haparanda from April 2021. An additional train makes two daily roundtrips between Umeå, Vindeln, and Hällnäs, where it leaves the Main Line and continues inland to Lycksele. Although most trains are powered by the 15 kV overheard supply, the line between Hällnäs and Lycksele is not electrified, so Norrtåg use a single Bombardier Itino Diesel multiple unit for these services.
