= Bombardier Regina =

Swedish electric multiple unit passenger train

Regina
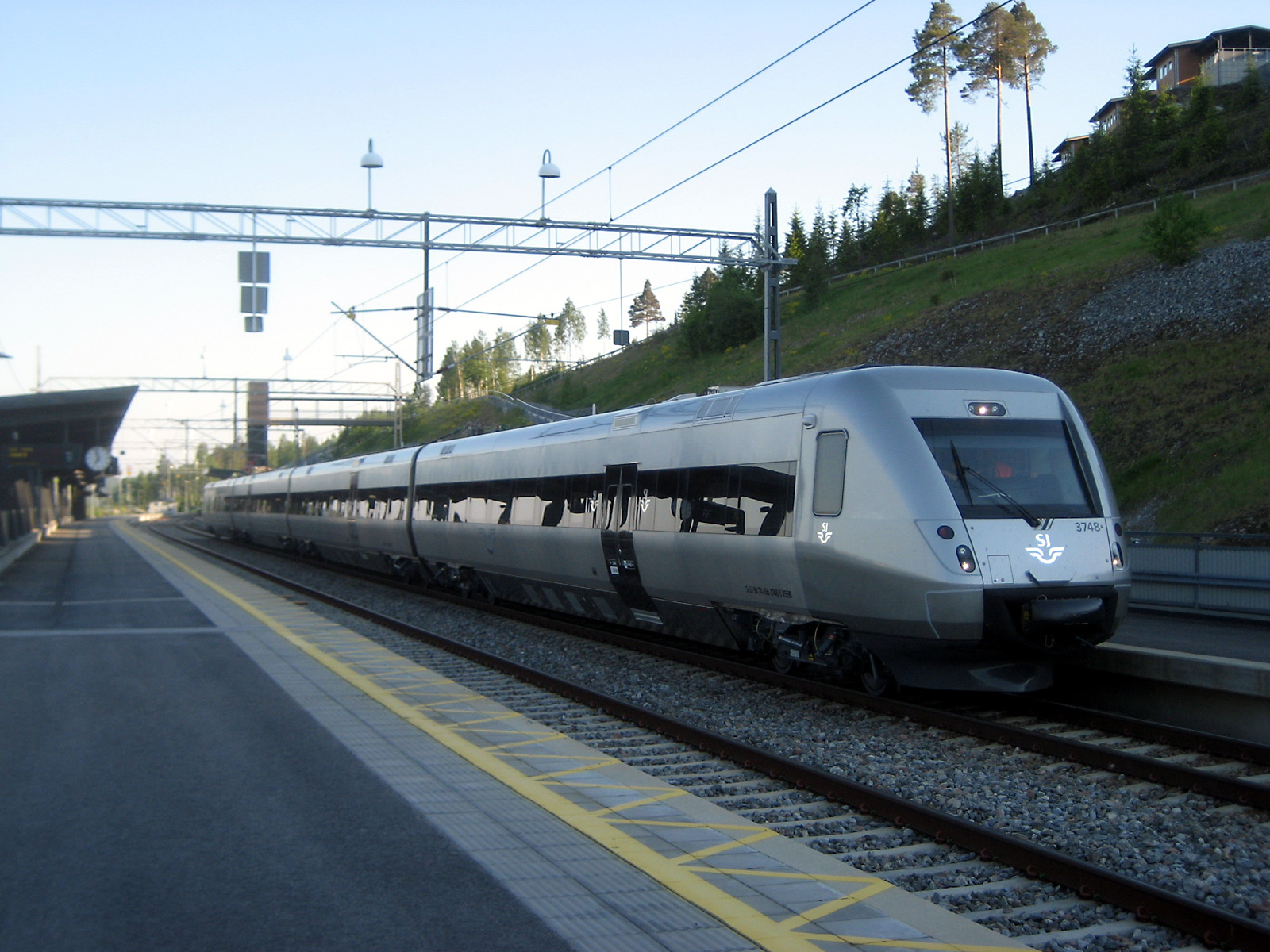
- X55 at Örnsköldsvik Central Station

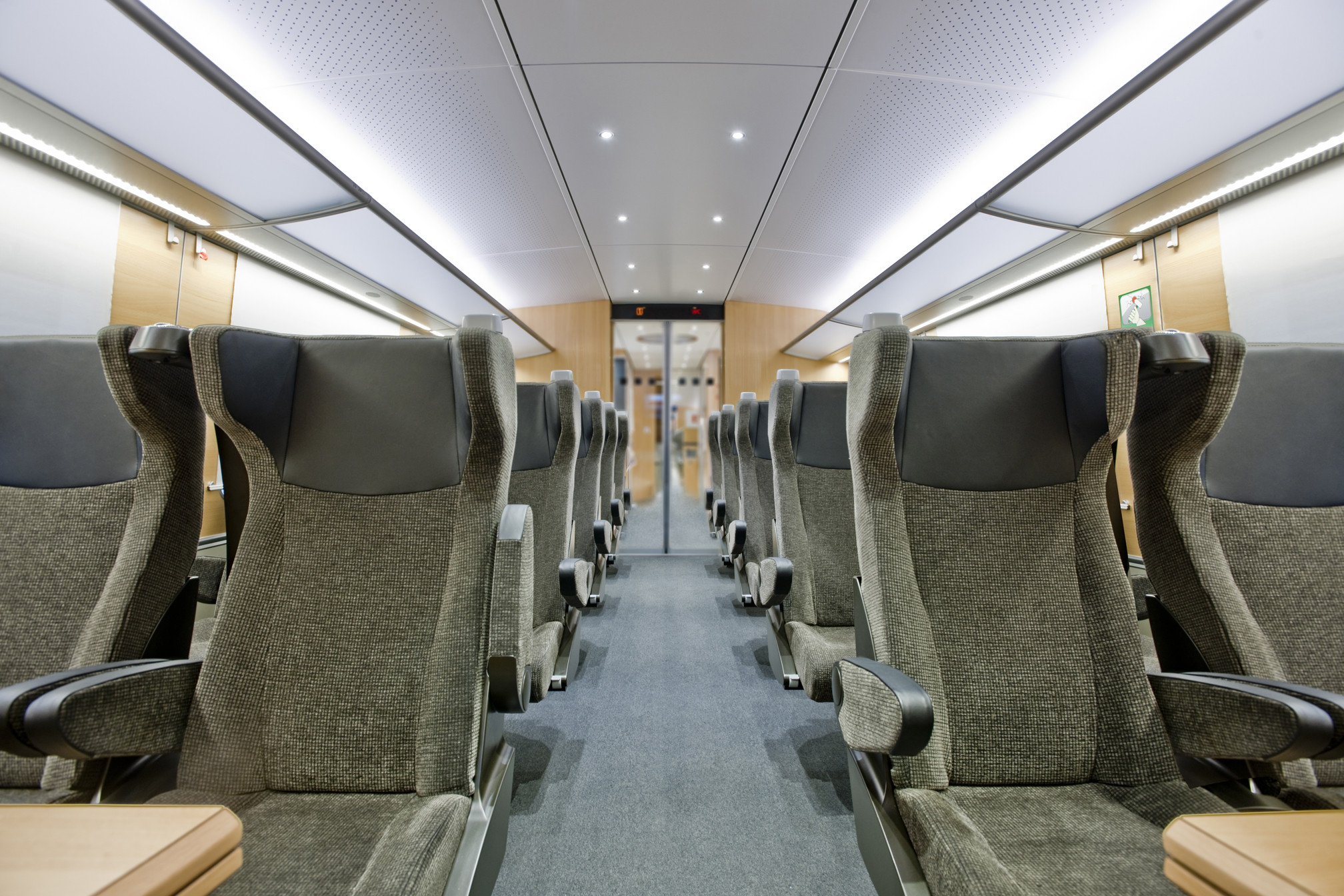
- SJ 3000/X55 Interior
- Stock type: Electric multiple unit
- In service: 2000–present
- Manufacturer: Bombardier Transportation
- Built at: Kalmar Verkstad, Kalmar, Sweden (X50–X54 models); Bombardier Hennigsdorf works, Hennigsdorf, Brandenburg, Germany (X55 model)
- Constructed: 2000–2013
- Number built: 109
- Formation: 2 or 3 cars
- Fleet numbers: various
- Capacity: 165–294
- Operators: SJ; Kollektivtrafikförvaltningen UL; Västtrafik; Transitio; Norrtåg; Värmlandstrafik; X-Tåget

Specifications
- Car body construction: Stainless steel
- Train length: Two cars: 53.9 m (176 ft 10 in); Three cars: 80.5 m (264 ft 1 in); Four cars: 105 m (344 ft 6 in)
- Width: 3,450 mm (11 ft 3 7/8 in)
- Maximum speed: Service: 180–200 km/h (110–125 mph); Design: 250 km/h (155 mph); Record: 303 km/h (188 mph)
- Weight: Two cars: 120 t (118.1 long tons; 132.3 short tons); Three cars: 165 t (162.4 long tons; 181.9 short tons)
- Traction system: 107–143 kN (24,000–32,000 lb_{f})
- Power output: Two cars: 1,590 kW (2,132 hp); Three cars: 2,120 kW (2,843 hp)
- Transmission: Westinghouse-Natal (WN) drive
- Electric system: 15 kV 16.7 Hz AC catenary
- Current collection: Pantograph
- Safety systems: ATC-2, ERTMS
- Track gauge: 1,435 mm (4 ft 8 1/2 in) standard gauge

The Regina is a Swedish model of electric multiple unit passenger train, manufactured by Bombardier Transportation (formerly Adtranz). It is used by the national passenger railway SJ along with numerous regional and private operators, in variants designated X50, X51, X52, X53, X54 and X55 (marketed as SJ 3000), and in two-, three-, and four-carriage models. The Regina units are short trains built for local and regional service. The Regina is wider than other Swedish trains; at 3.45 m (11 ft 3 7/8 in), it allows five-across seating, increasing passenger capacity by 25%. The car body is built of stainless steel, with only bolsters and coupler pockets made of mild steel. The length is 54 m (177 ft 2 in), 80 m (262 ft 6 in) and 105 m (344 ft 6 in), and the capacity is 165-294 seats. A variant of the Regina is used in China as the CRH1.

Top speeds of various models range from 180 to 200 km/h (110 to 125 mph). As part of the Gröna tåget ("the green train") project, a modified X52 train set the Swedish rail-speed record of 303 km/h (188 mph) on 14 September 2008; the goal was to reach 250 km/h (155 mph) in regular service.

== History ==
=== SJ X55/3000 (new high-speed train) ===
In late 2007, it was announced that SJ were ordering twenty units furnished for inter-city service. These trains, designated X55 (also marketed as SJ 3000), were delivered during 2011 and 2012, and are used on the routes connecting Stockholm with destinations like Sundsvall, Karlstad, Oslo, and Falun, allowing the displaced X 2000 units to be used instead to lengthen the busy trains running to Gothenburg and Malmö. These units are four-carriage trains with a first-class section and an on-board bistro; four-across seating. There is an option for another 20 units.

On 6 February 2012, the trains made their debut on the Stockholm–Sundsvall route. The Bothnia Line Umeå–Västeraspby requires trains to be equipped with the European Rail Traffic Management System (ERTMS), which is why X55 runs there but not X2's (X 2000).

== Gallery ==
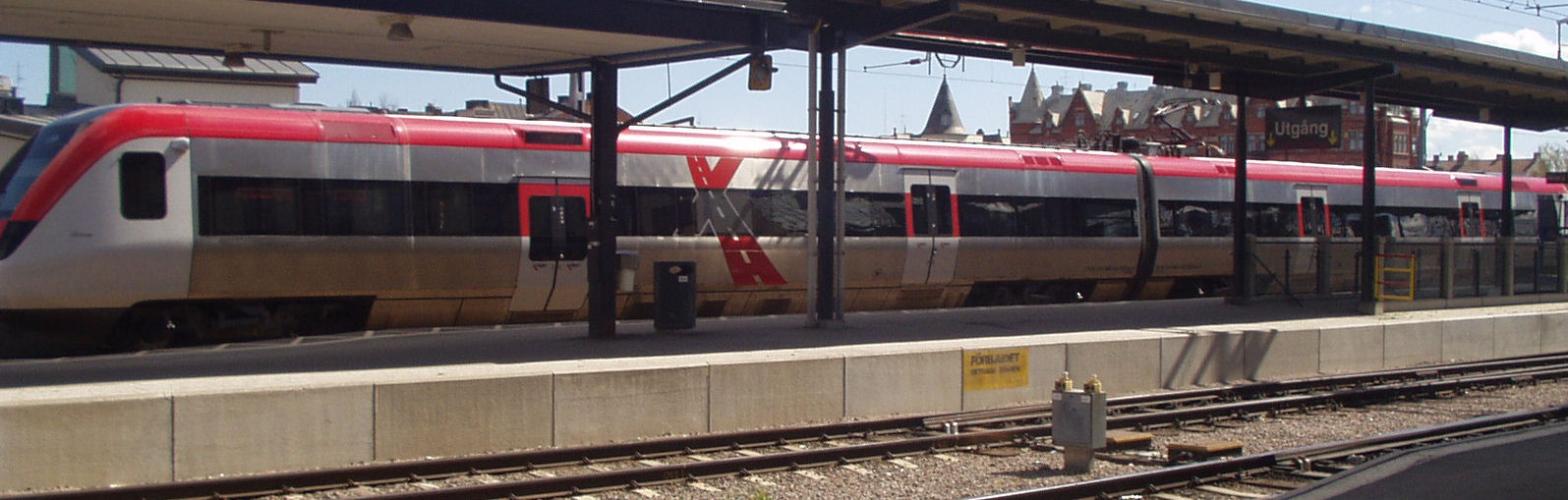
An X-Tåget Regina at Gävle Central Station

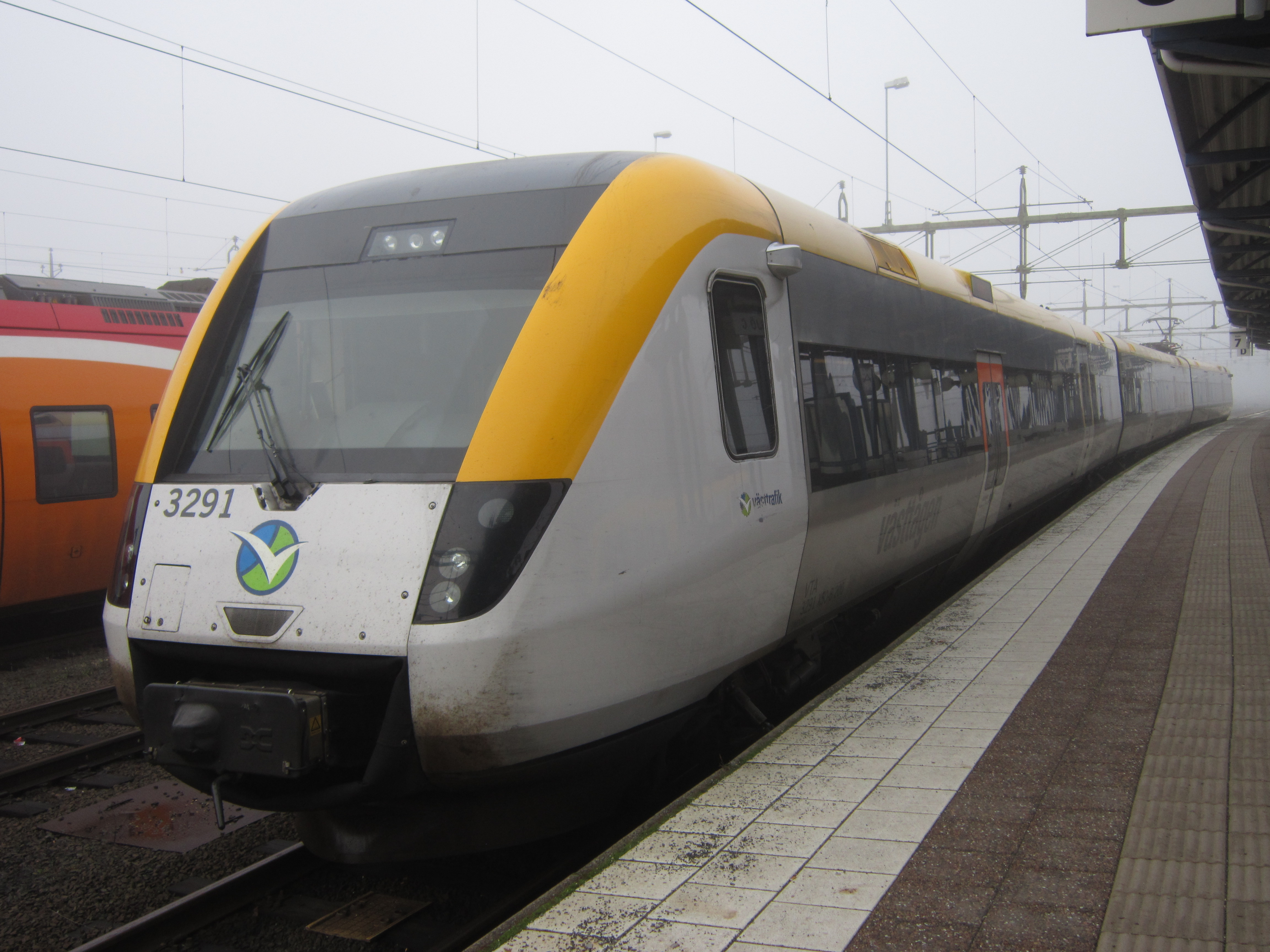
Västtrafik X50 at Nässjö C

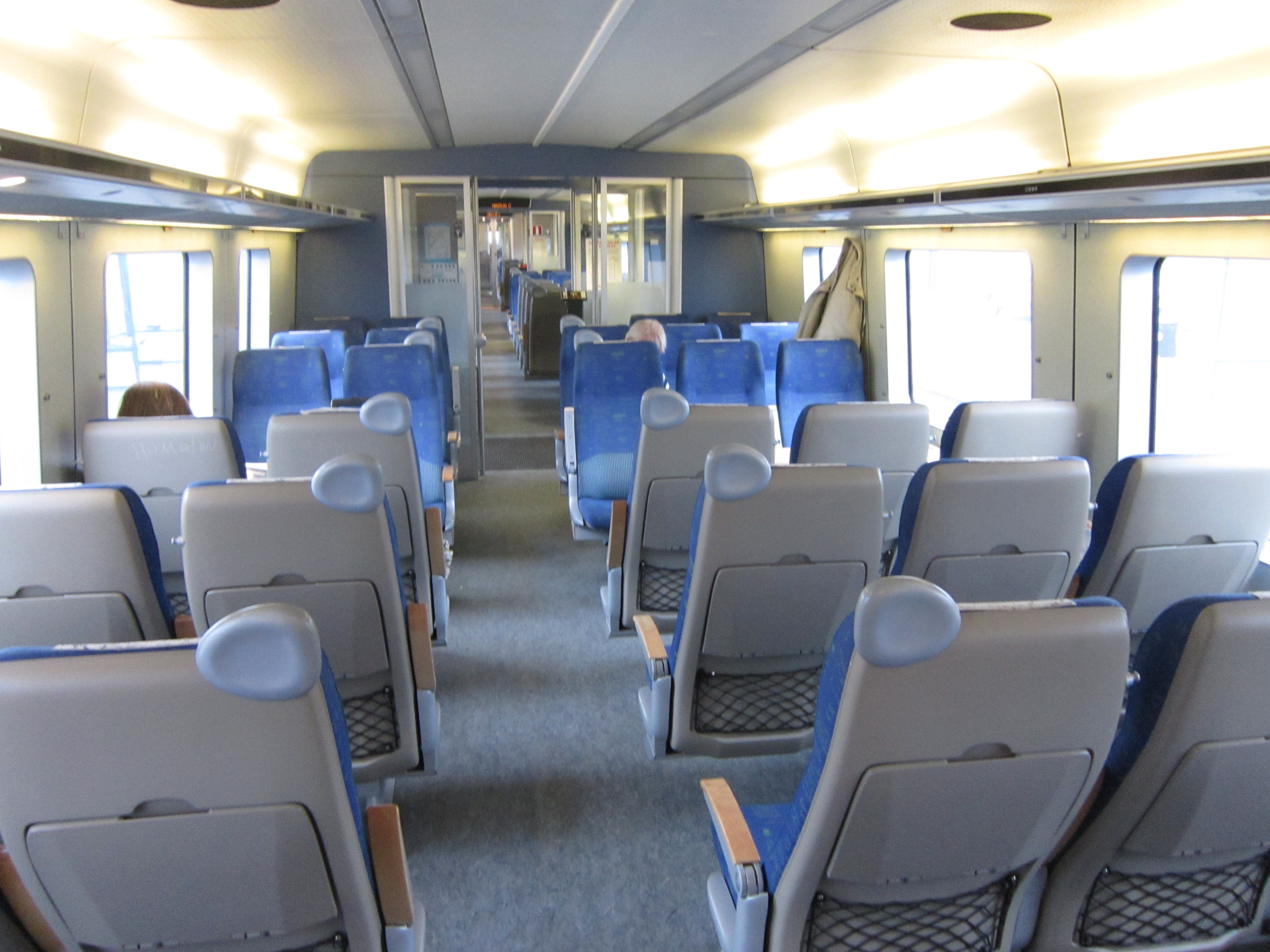
Västtrafik X50 interior

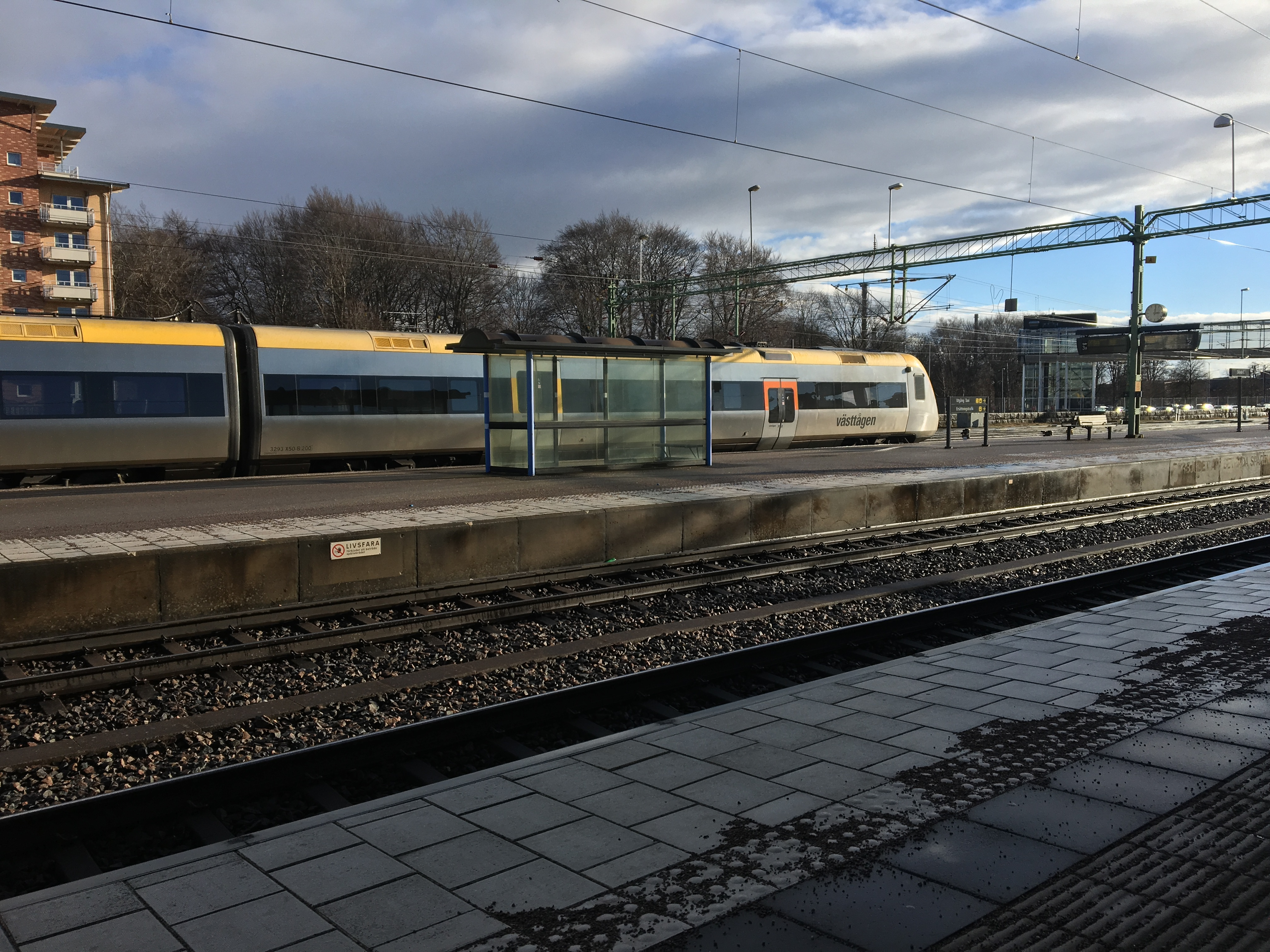
X50-B in Skövde

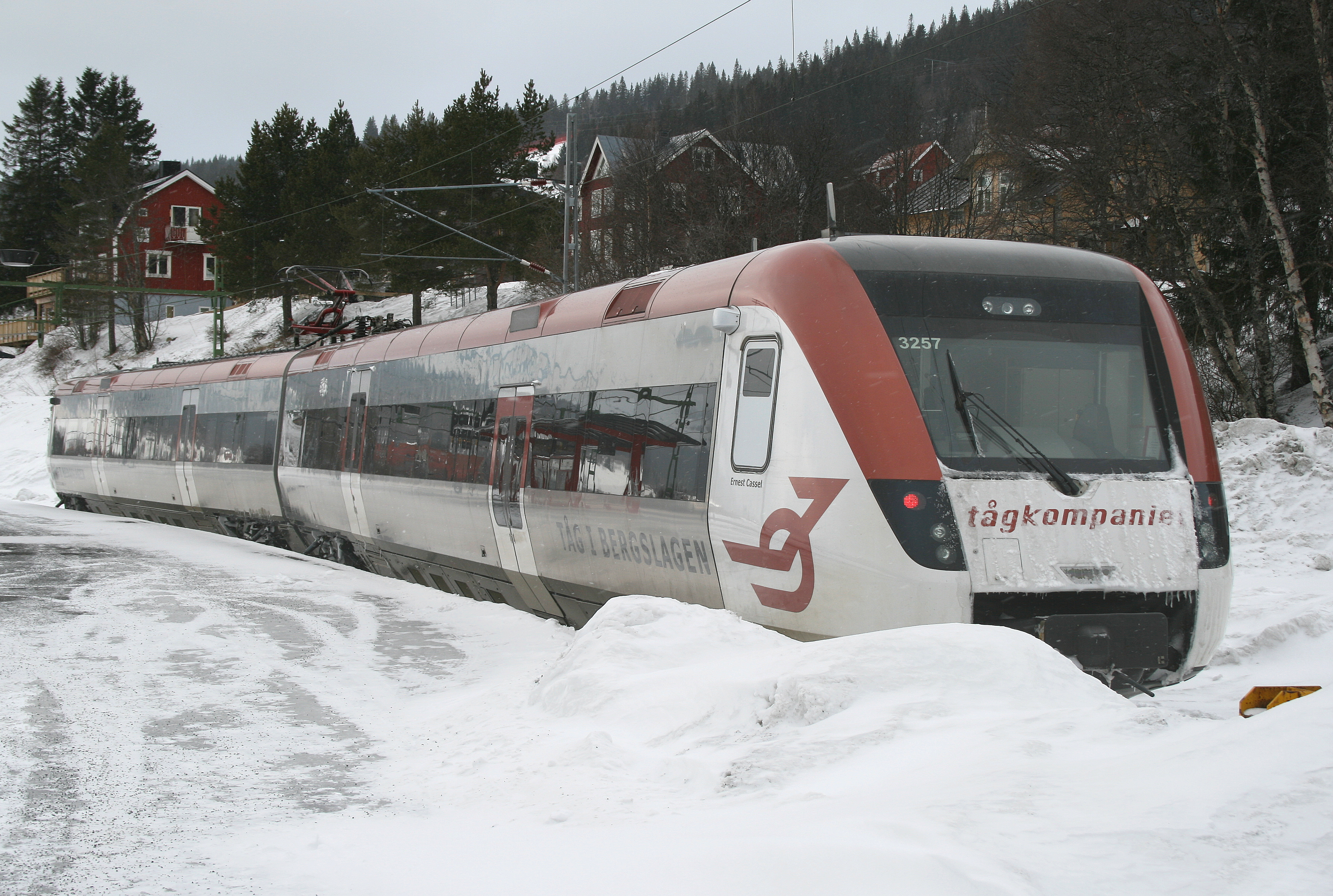
Tåg i Bergslagen X51 in Åre

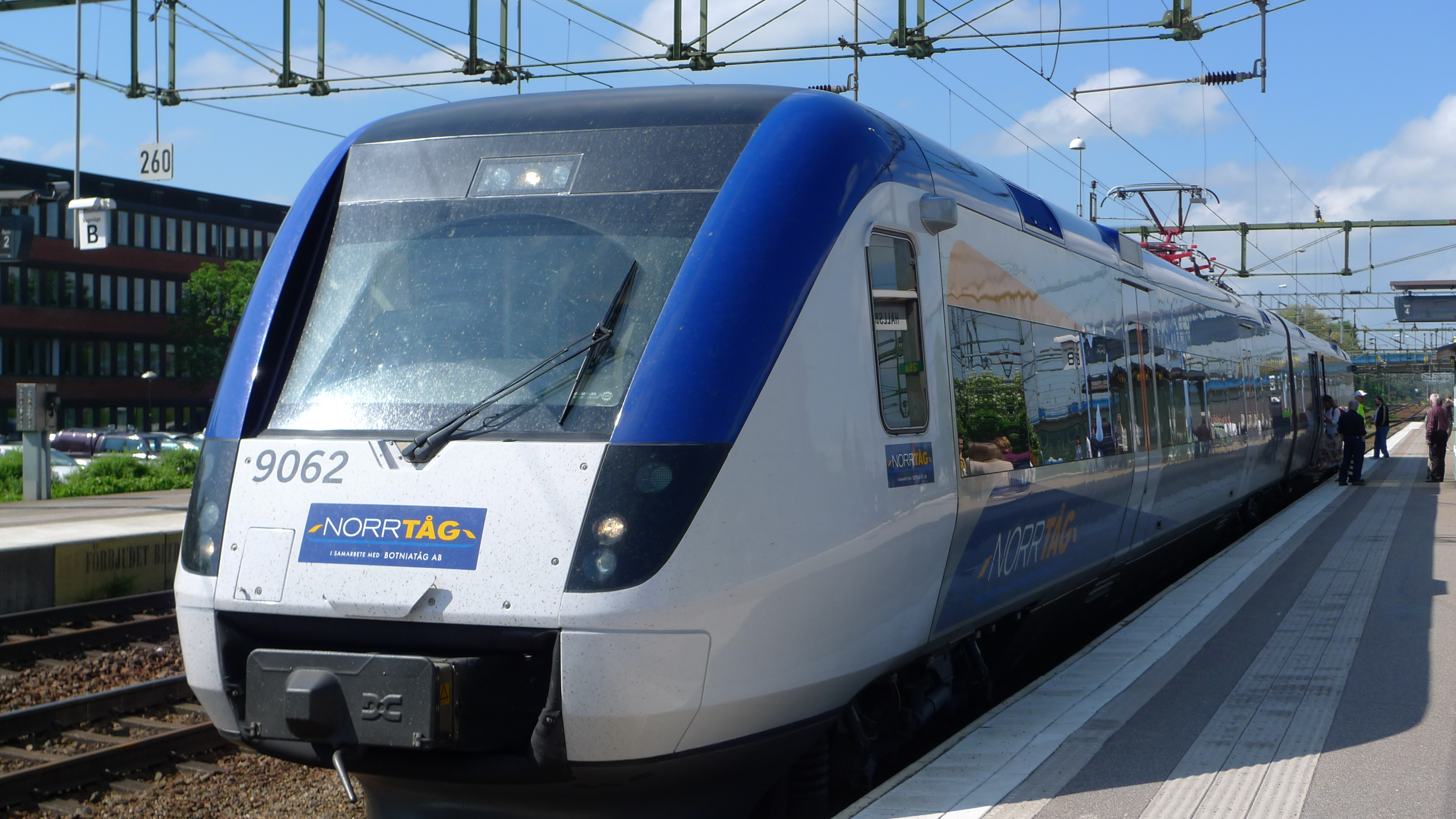
Norrtåg X52 (ex-Gröna tåget trainset) in Hallsberg

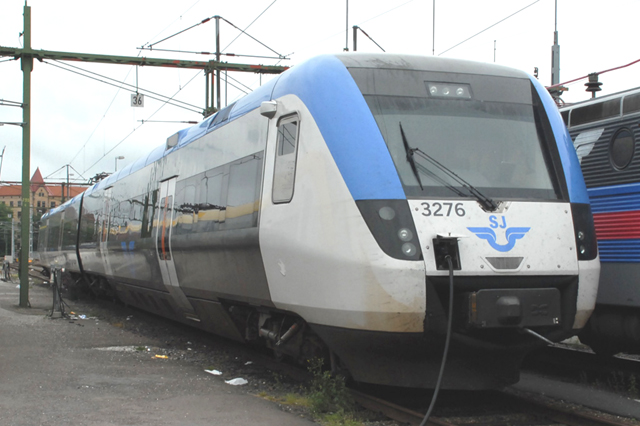
SJ X52-2 at Gothenburg Central Station

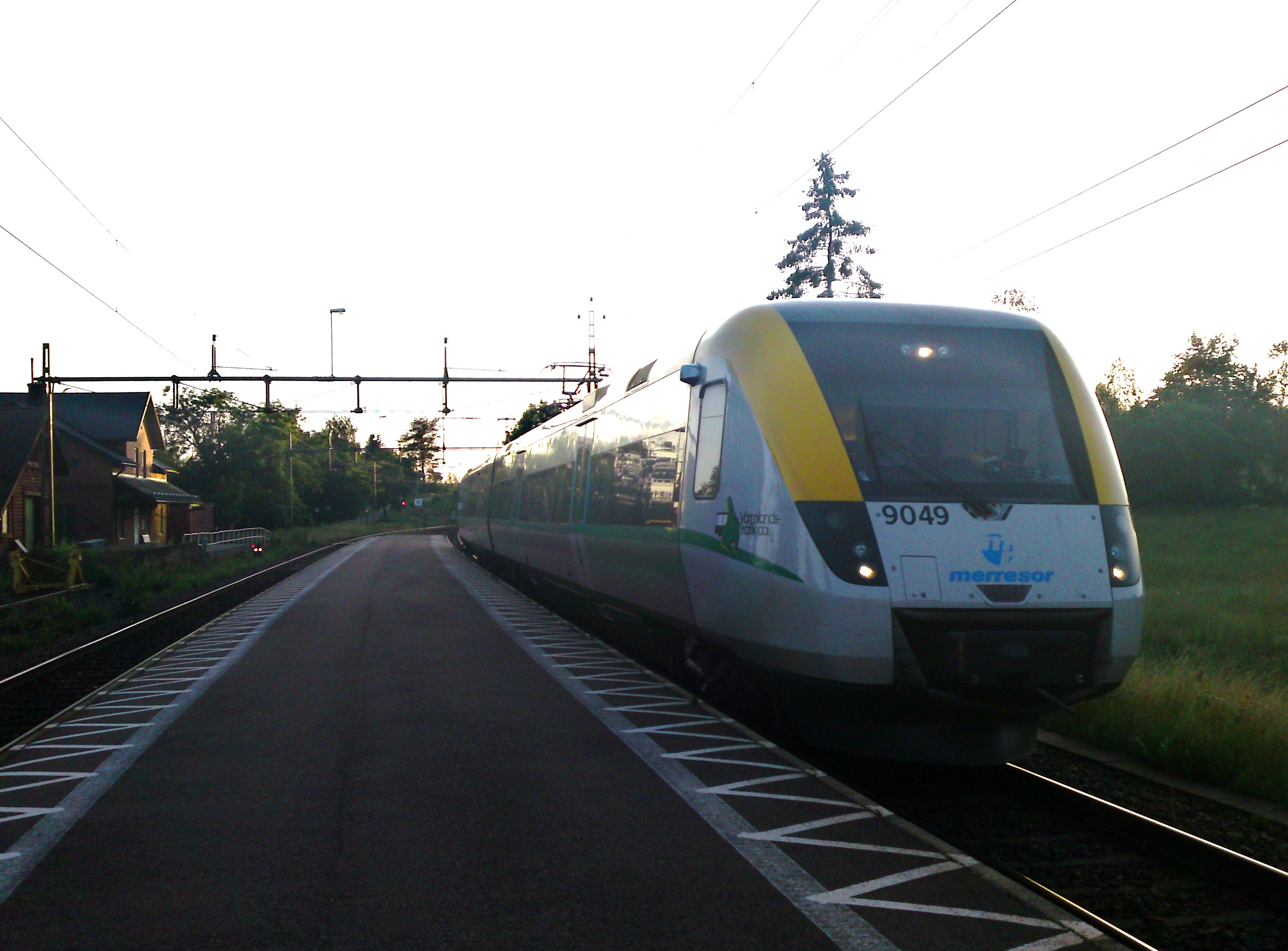
Värmlandstrafik X53 in Högboda

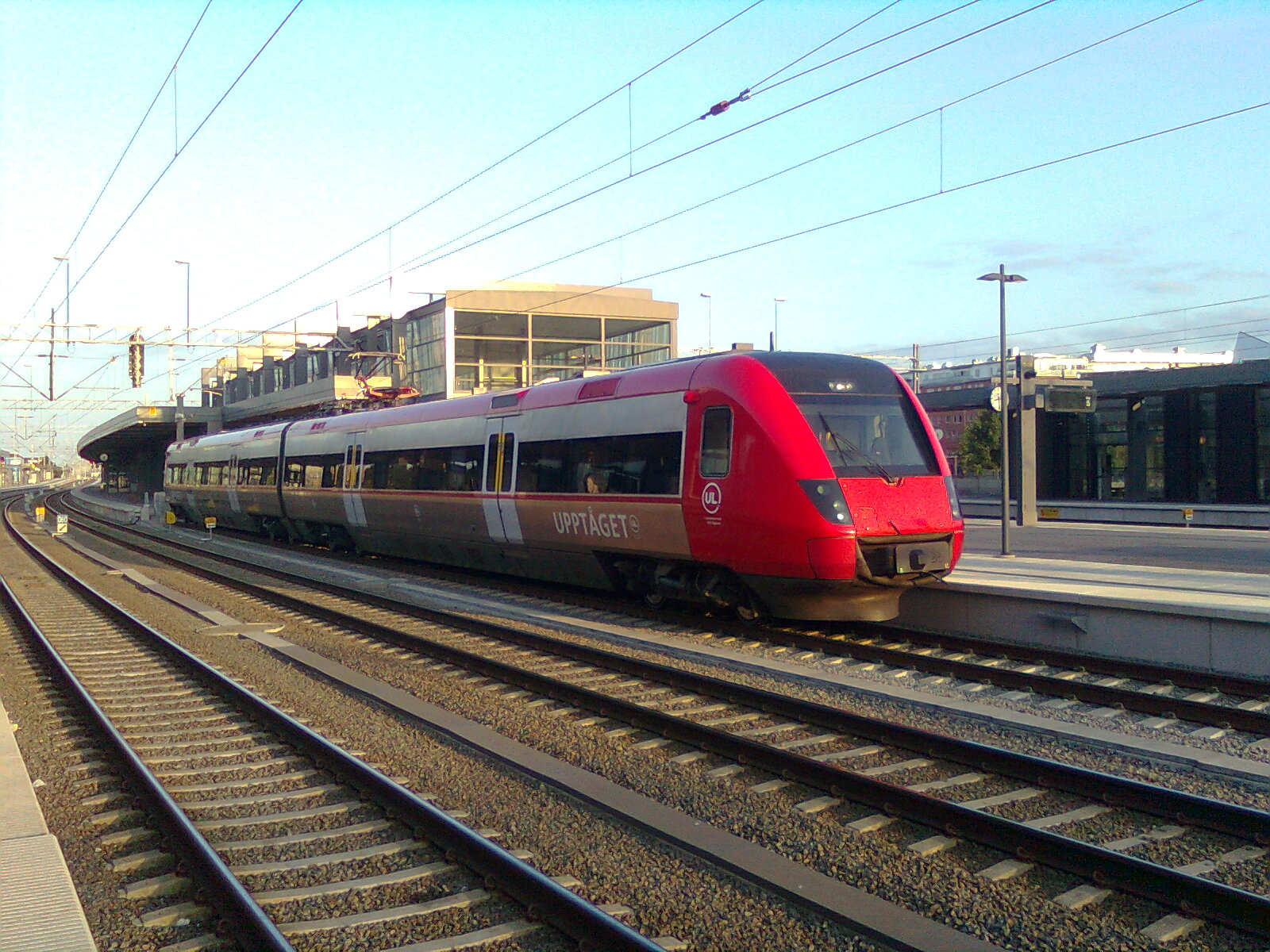
Upptåget (now Mälartåg) X52 operated by Transdev for the regional public transport authourity of Uppsala

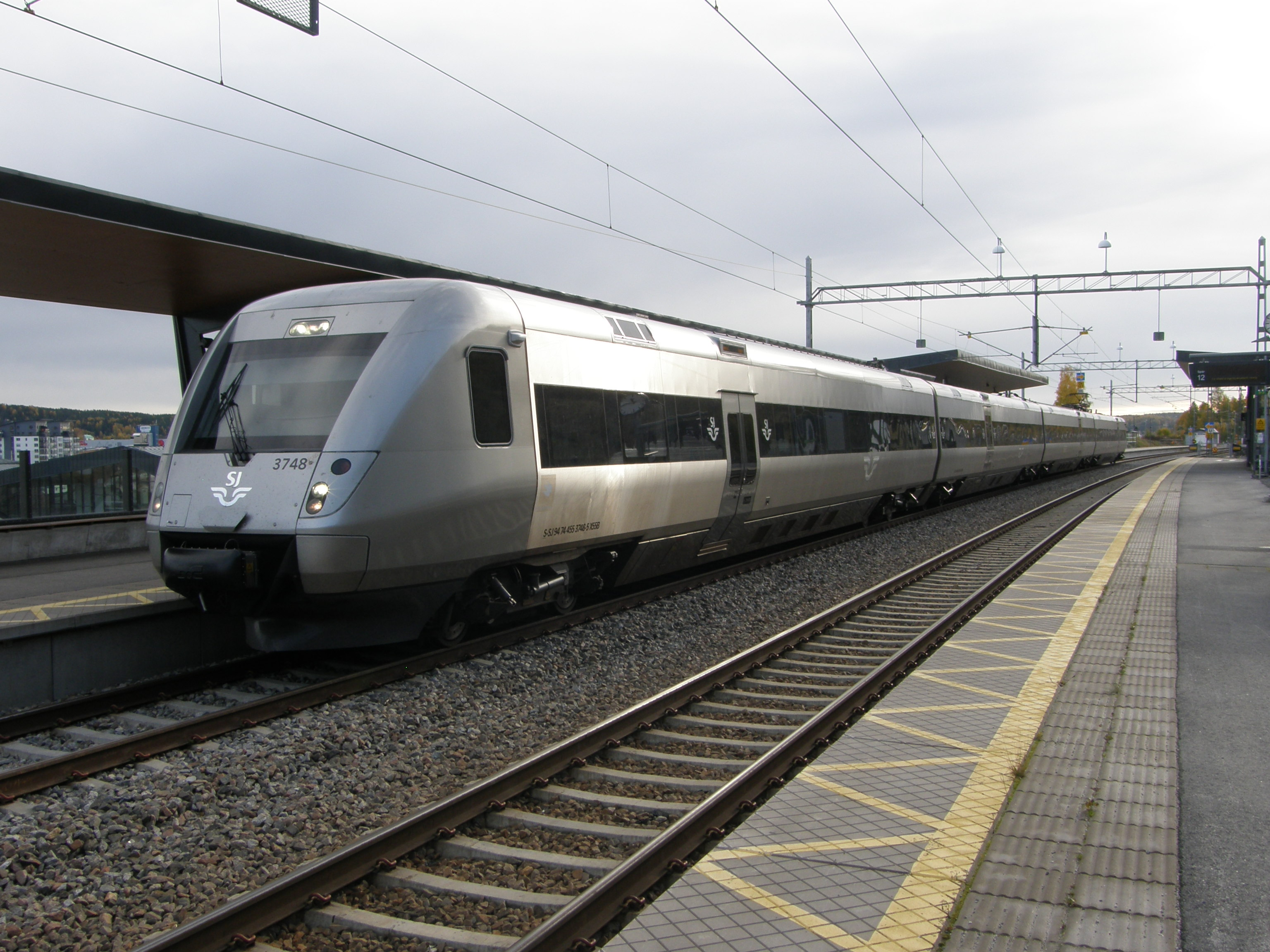
SJ X55 at Örnsköldsvik Central Station

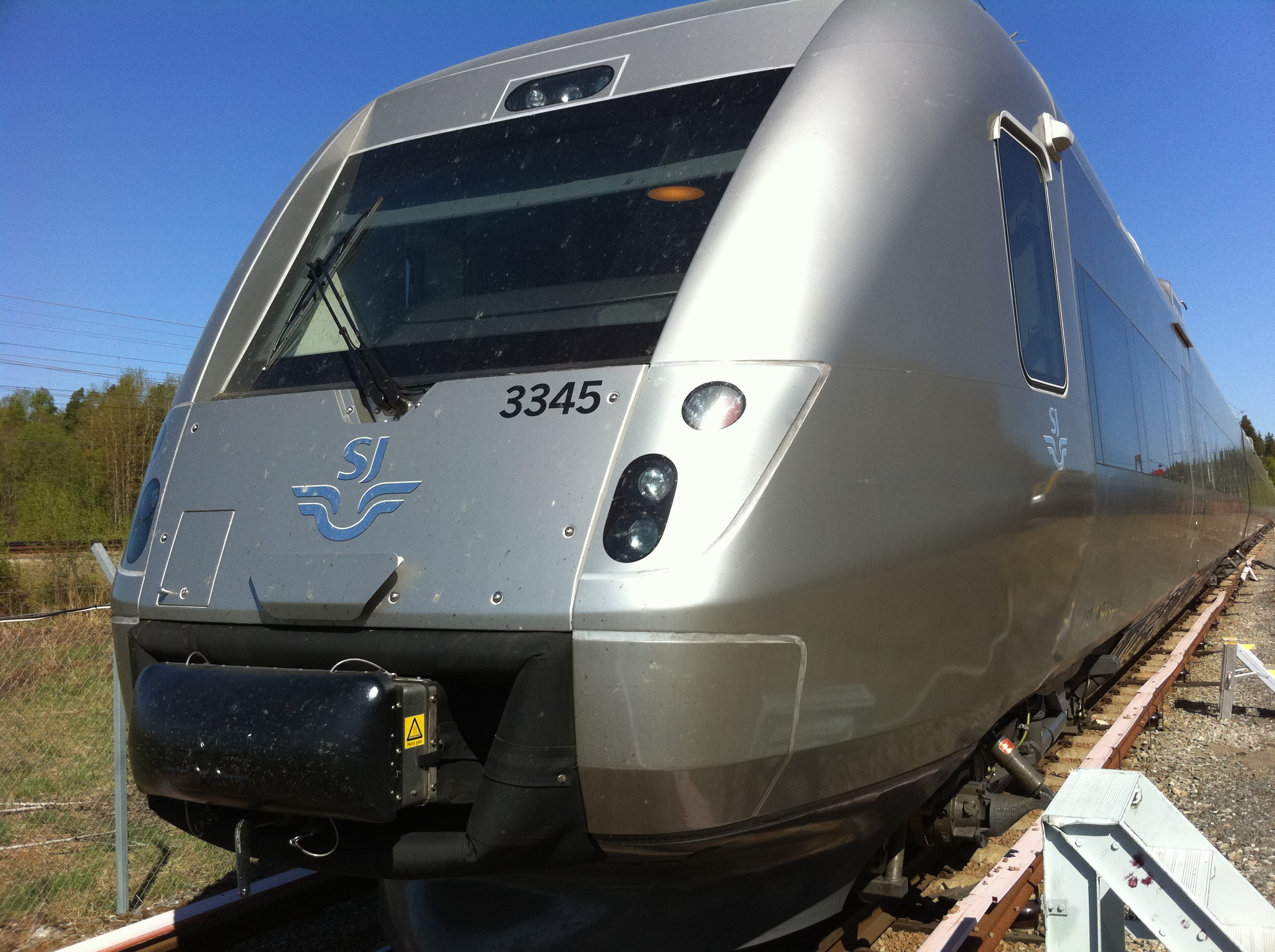
SJ X55

== See also ==
- List of high-speed trains
- China Railway CRH1
