= Kiruna Station =

ESA tracking station in Sweden

Coordinates: 67.857128°N 20.964325°E

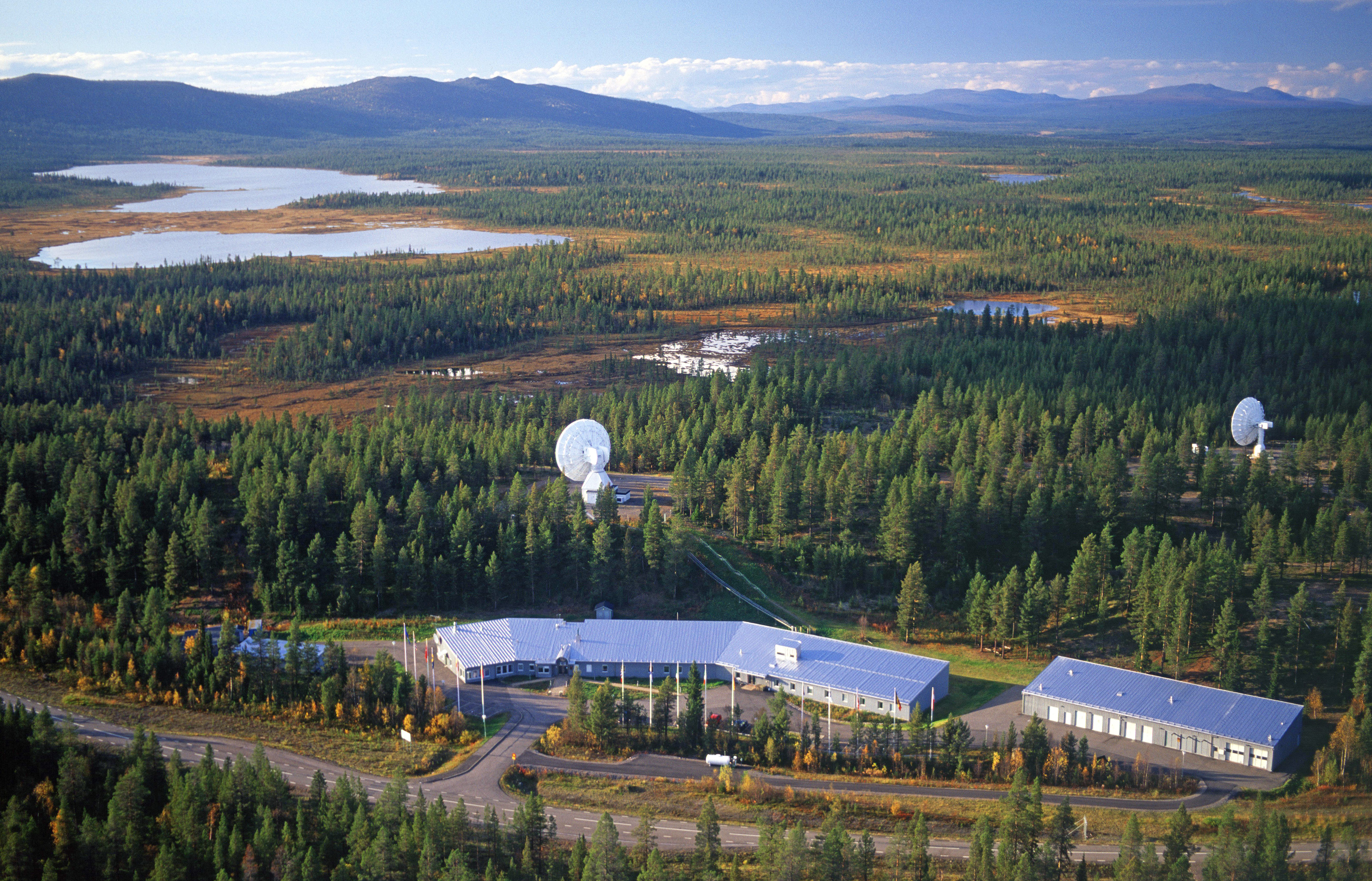
Kiruna station

Kiruna Station is an ESTRACK radio antenna station for communication with spacecraft operated by the Swedish Space Corporation. It is located 38 km east of Kiruna, Sweden. The site hosts one 15 metre- and one 13-metre-diameter antenna, each with S- and X-band reception and S-band transmission. It also hosts a GPS-Tracking and Data Facility (TDF) antenna.

It is mainly used for the ERS-2, Envisat, and ASTRO-F missions.

== See also ==
- Esrange Space Center
