= Bothnia Line =

High-speed railway line in Sweden

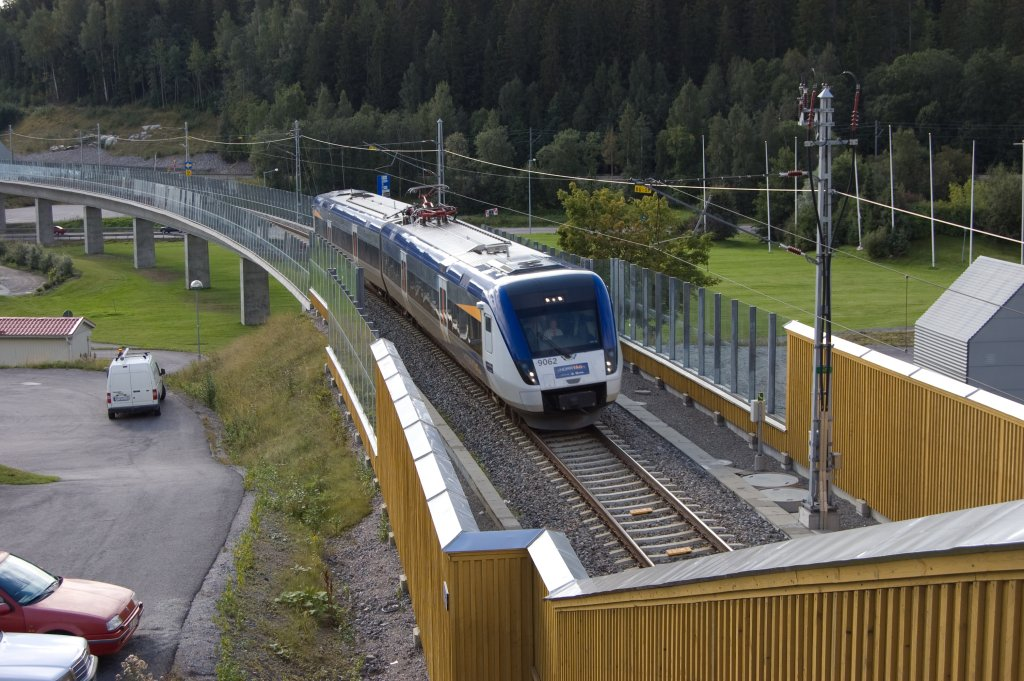
- Bridge through Örnsköldsvik

Overview
- Status: Open
- Owner: Botniabanan AB
- Locale: Sweden
- Termini: Höga Kusten Airport (connects Ådalen Line); Umeå

Service
- Type: High-speed rail
- System: Swedish railway
- Operator(s): Swedish Transport Administration

History
- Opened: 29 August 2010

Technical
- Line length: 190 km (120 mi)
- Number of tracks: 1
- Character: Passenger and freight
- Track gauge: 1,435 mm (4 ft 8 1/2 in)
- Electrification: 15 kV 16.7 Hz AC
- Operating speed: Service: 200 km/h (125 mph); Design: 250 km/h (155 mph)
- Signalling: ERTMS

The Bothnia Line (Swedish: Botniabanan) is a high-speed railway line in northern Sweden. The 190 km (118 mi) long route, from Höga Kusten Airport, where it connects to the Ådalen Line, via Örnsköldsvik to Umeå, was opened in 2010 and trains are allowed to travel at speeds up to 250 km/h (155 mph). Although, no train with a higher top speed than 200 km/h (125 mph) uses the railway as of 2023.

== Introduction ==
Completed in August 2010, the Bothnia Line adds 190 kilometres (118 mi) of high-speed railway to the Swedish railway network. At up to 250 km/h (155 mph) this is also the highest-speed track in the country. The route branches off from the Ådalen Line at Höga Kusten Airport just north of Kramfors and goes via Örnsköldsvik to Umeå where it connects to the Umeå-Vännäs line and the main line through Upper Norrland. The railway line has 140 bridges and 25 km (16 mi) of tunnels.

Construction was carried out by Botniabanan AB, a company owned 91% by the Swedish government and 9% by the municipalities of Kramfors, Örnsköldsvik, Nordmaling and Umeå. Work began on the line in 1999, and reached the halfway point at the end of 2005. After its completion in 2010, the line was leased to the Swedish Rail Administration. When Botniabanan AB has recovered its investment (estimated to be 2050), the ownership of the line will pass to the Rail Administration. The construction budget was SEK 15 billion.

It is intended that the Bothnia Line will compete with road transport using the European route E4, which is a main road carrying heavy freight traffic; however because the line uses the European Rail Traffic Management System signal system, which most of Sweden does not, relatively few freight train operators have invested in the ERTMS technology for their locomotives.

Passenger traffic between Umeå and Örnsköldsvik began in August 2010. The delayed upgrade of the ERTMS signal system on the Ådalen Line meant that traffic south of Örnsköldsvik did not begin until 2012.

== Purpose ==
A railway line along the coast of northern Sweden has been considered beneficial for many years, with a lack of capacity and long travel times on the existing main line (further inland) because of lower speed limits, curves, and gradients. The Bothnia line also improves public mobility in the area, reducing the travel time between Umeå and Örnsköldsvik to 50 minutes via high-speed train. It is also served by regional trains, at a frequency of up to two trains (mostly one train) in each direction an hour.

== Railway standard ==
The line is single track (with grading and other provisions for a second track), and has 22 passing loops. The maximum axle weight is 25 tonnes at 120 km/h (75 mph) (freight trains) and 250 km/h (155 mph) permitted for passenger trains. Curves have a radius of 3,200 m (10,499 ft) or more, except for the passage of Örnsköldsvik (down to 600 m (1,969 ft) and a few between 2,000 and 2,500 m (6,562 and 8,202 ft). The maximum grade is 1%.

== Delayed stretch through the natural reservation area ==
The middle part of the railway was ready for traffic in 2008, and all of the railway except the northern part from October 2009. The northern part, near Umeå, did not see operation until August 2010, due to a court battle over the placement of a bridge that crosses over environmentally sensitive areas at the Ume River. These areas are protected as a nature reserve and the process to approve its location was opposed by environmentalists and neighbours concerned about their properties. Other alternatives to the present location were deemed unacceptably close to the Umeå Airport for safety reasons, and a tunnel under the airport and river would have been much too expensive. A more southerly route would have lengthened the line and been more expensive. The crux of this debate was that the nature reserve was established some years after the railway line placement had been fixed.

There was no passenger traffic before all of the railway was finished, because the largest city, Umeå, was not connected to this line before then, though some freight traffic used the finished sections.

== Times, distances and average speed ==
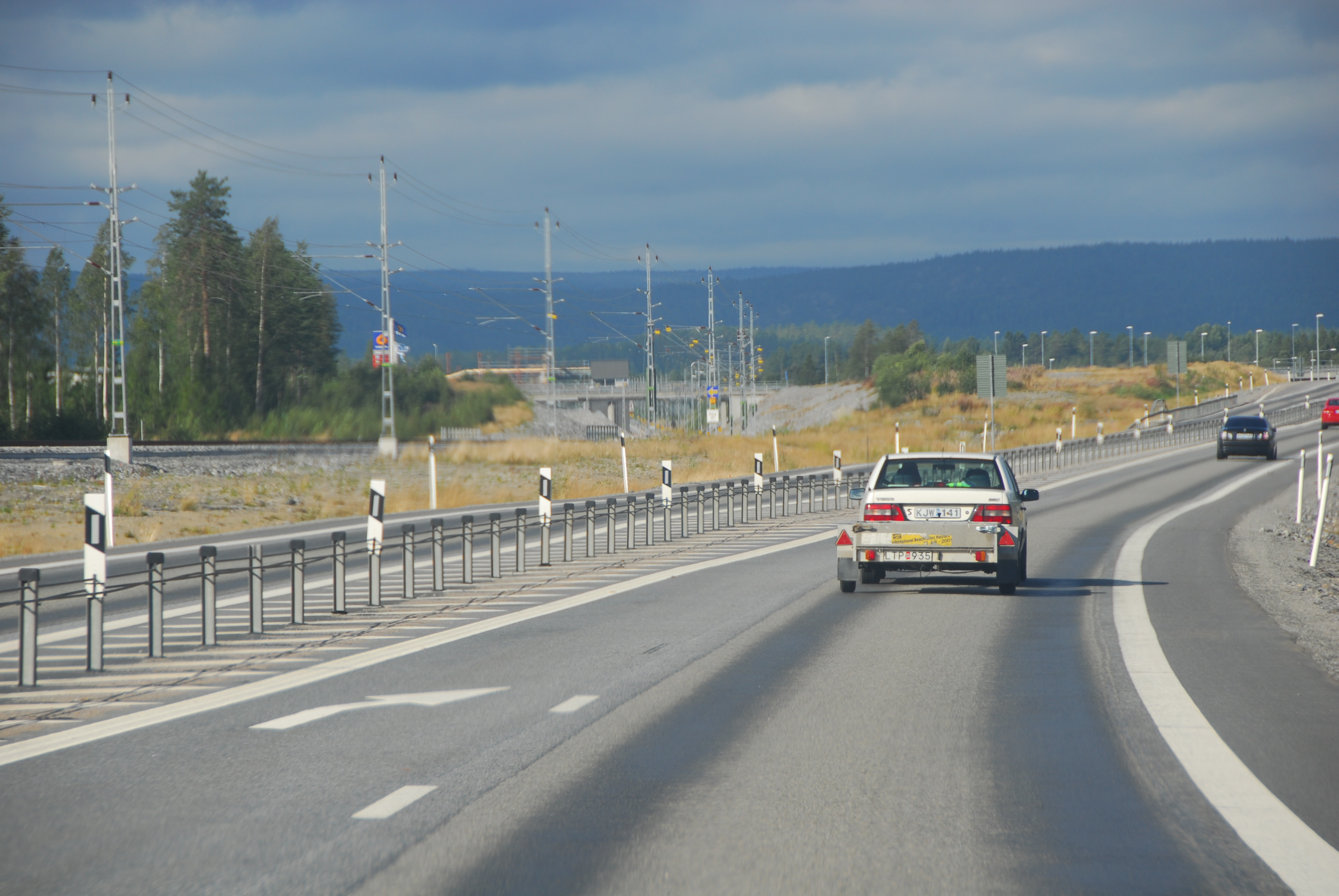
The railway runs parallel to the European Route E4

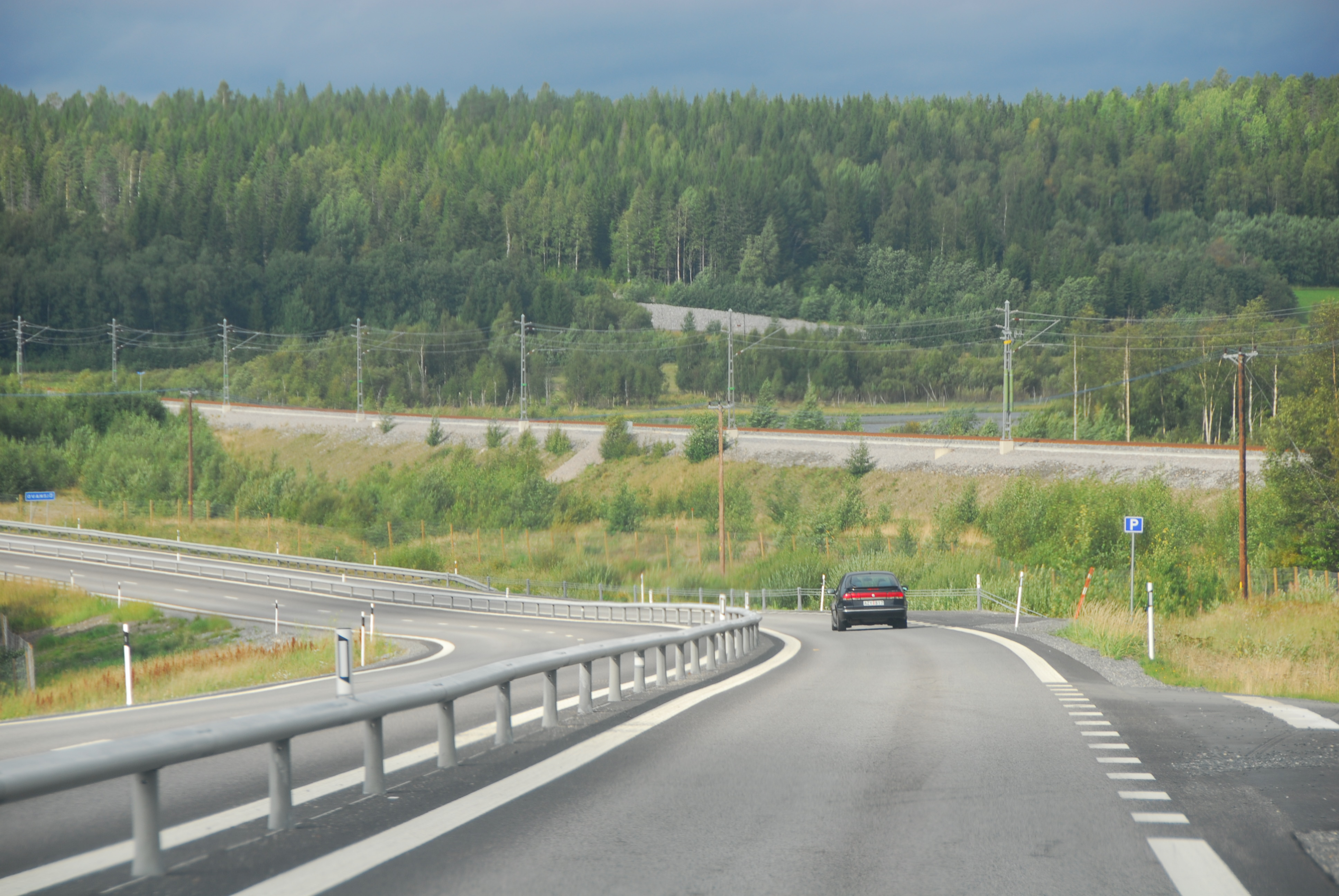
The line near Ovansjö, Örnsköldsvik Municipality

Connection	Time	Distance	Average speed
Örnsköldsvik-Umeå	0:48	112 km	140 km/h (inter-city)
Kramfors-Örnsköldsvik	0:35	86 km	150 km/h (inter-city)
Sundsvall-Umeå	2:30	300 km	120 km/h
Örnsköldsvik-Umeå	0:58	112 km	120 km/h (regional)
Stockholm-Umeå	6:05	680 km	110 km/h

The railway line itself allows 250 km/h (155 mph). The trains will run at 180–200 km/h (110–125 mph) for the first several years, with a speed increase in the future. Scheduled for around 2026, when SJ gets new SJ Zefiro Express (SJ 250) designed for 250 km/h (155 mph).

The Transitio leasing company owned by the counties signed a contract in October 2008 to buy Alstom Coradia trains. These trains were delivered in 2011, and they have a top speed of 180 km/h (112 mph). For long-distance trains from Stockholm, SJ runs X55 trains (SJ 3000), with a top speed of 200 km/h (125 mph).

The Bothnia Line was also the first line in Sweden equipped with the signalling system ERTMS (Level 2) and has been tested at 289 km/h (180 mph) on the southern part of the Bothnia Line. Currently, Swedish signalling and its ATP safety system (ATC) is only validated up to 210 km/h (130 mph).

Parts of the railway started to be used by freight trains on 16 October 2008, but with manual train protection control.

No Alstom train was delivered for the traffic opening in August 2010, since the delivery time is at least two years. One train of the type Regina was rented from southern Sweden for the Umeå-Örnsköldsvik traffic, with a top speed of 200 km/h (125 mph). Traffic to and from Sundsvall started autumn 2012. SJ ran the Stockholm-Narvik and Göteborg-Luleå night trains over Långsele-Mellansel-Örnsköldsvik-Umeå from August 2010, and from 2012 the shorter way Sundsvall-Kramfors-Umeå.

== Stations ==
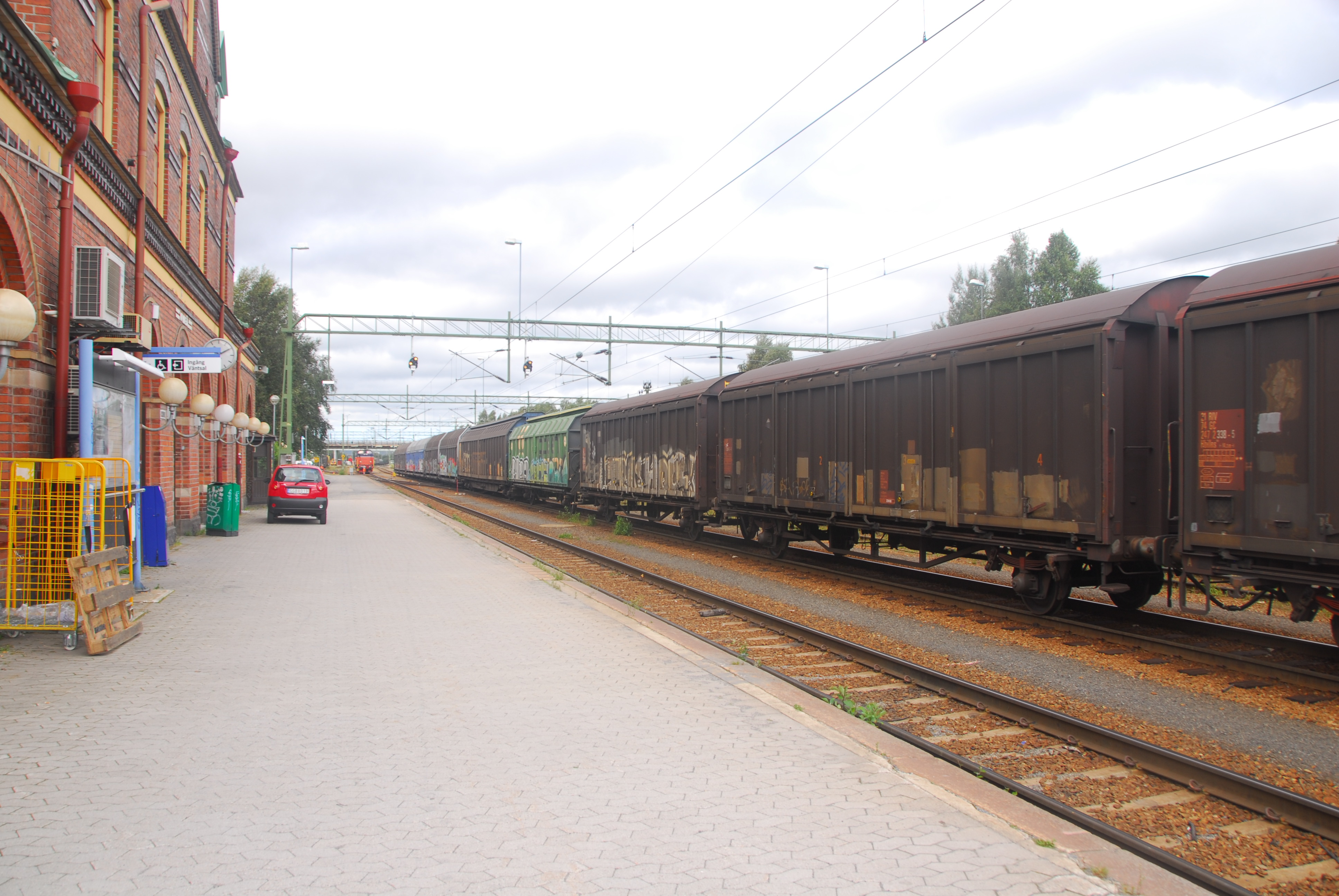
The line ends at Umeå Central Station

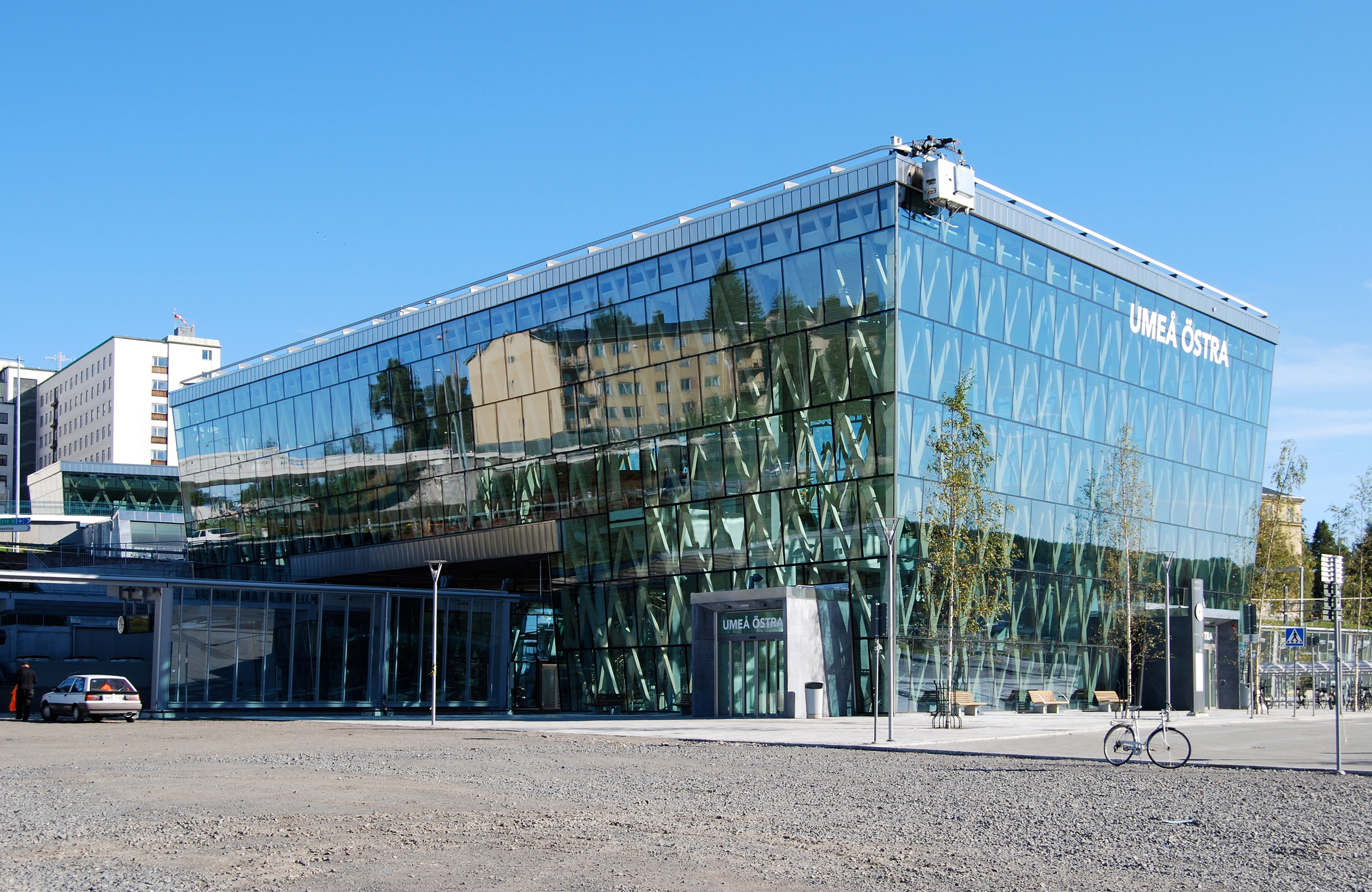
Umeå East in September 2010

The trains stop at:

On the Ådalen Line:

- Sundsvall Central Station 319.391 km
- Timrå 295.681 km
- Härnösand 248.051 km
- Kramfors 208.366 km
- Västeraspby (transfer, upon request, to the Höga Kusten Airport; about 2 km road distance)

On the Bothnia Line:

- Örnsköldsvik Central Station 115.402 km
- Örnsköldsvik North 112.986 km
- Husum 90.313 km
- Nordmaling 58.109 km
- Hörnefors 34.856 km
- Umeå East Station 2.016 km
- Umeå Central Station 0 km

Some trains stop at the larger stations only.

The most used station is forecast to be Umeå East, since it is within walking distance of Umeå University and the University Hospital. Umeå Central Station was closed in 2010 and 2011 for rebuilding.

== Ådalen Line ==
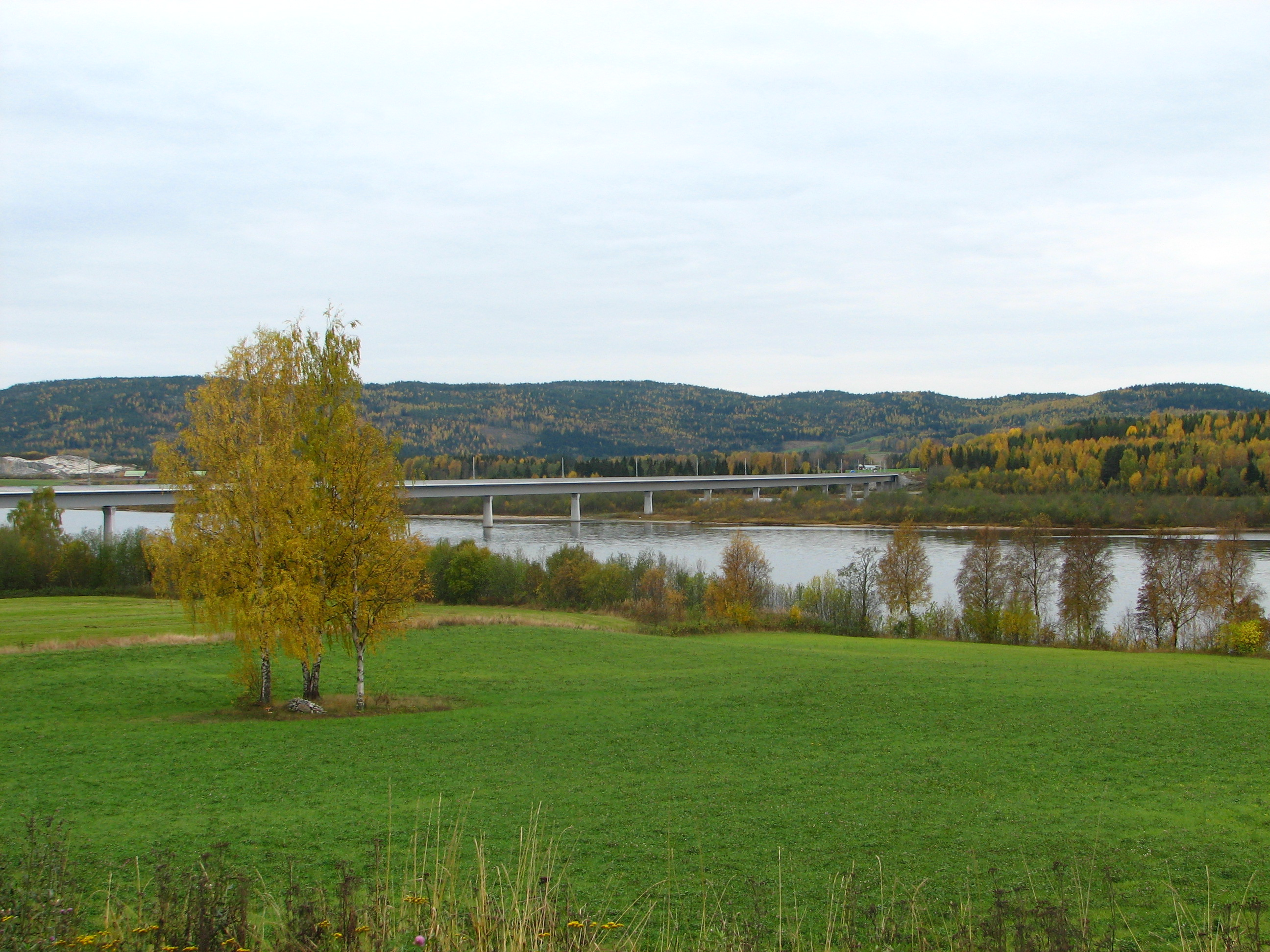
The bridge across Ångerman River

The Bothnia Line ends near the Höga Kusten Airport at the existing Ådalen Line, which runs Långsele–Kramfors–Härnösand–Sundsvall. The distance from the connection to Sundsvall is 101 km (63 mi). This railway was built from 1890 to 1925, and is rather curvy and in poor condition. From 2003 to 2012, the Ådalen Line was improved along the existing route to allow higher speeds than before, with a maximum speed of 150 km/h (95 mph). The improvements included new rails, new catenary, a new signalling system (ERTMS) and better and fewer road crossings. A few parts of it north of Härnösand (totalling 30 km (19 mi)) were replaced with a new route, built to the same standard as the Bothnia Line, with a maximum speed of 200 km/h (125 mph). The reason for keeping most of the existing route is that the advantage of building a new railway is smaller when there already is a railway, but the costs for a new railway would be the same as if there was no railway, which is the case along the Bothnia Line. The total improvement cost for the Ådalen Line was 6 billion SEK.

== Old main line ==
The Main Line Through Upper Norrland from Bräcke to Boden was built between 1880 and 1895. It was deliberately built 30–100 km (19–62 mi) inland from the coast to protect it from military attacks. The Bothnia Line replaced all passenger traffic on the Main Line Through Upper Norrland between Bräcke and Vännäs, ending service to the stations at Långsele and Mellansel. The line remains in use by freight traffic and occasional diversions of passenger trains during engineering works.

== North Bothnia Line ==
The North Bothnia Line (Norrbotniabanan) is a planned extension of the Bothnia Line north of Umeå to Luleå. The distance is about 270 km (168 mi), longer than the Bothnia Line. The preliminary decision to build the line as far as Skellefteå has been made. Construction began in 2020 on the first section of the line from Västerslätt in Umeå to Sävar.

Both the North Bothnia Line and the Bothnia Line will have the advantage of immediately reducing the cost of the frequent and heavy freight traffic when finished. They will provide large travel time reductions for passengers compared to buses; for example, travel time between Umeå and Luleå may be reduced by at least 1.5 hours.
