= Vy Tåg =

Swedish railway company, part of the Vy Group

- Franchises: Norrtåg; Krösatågen; Värmlandstrafik; X-Tåget
- Parent company: Vy

Other
- Website: www.vy.se/en

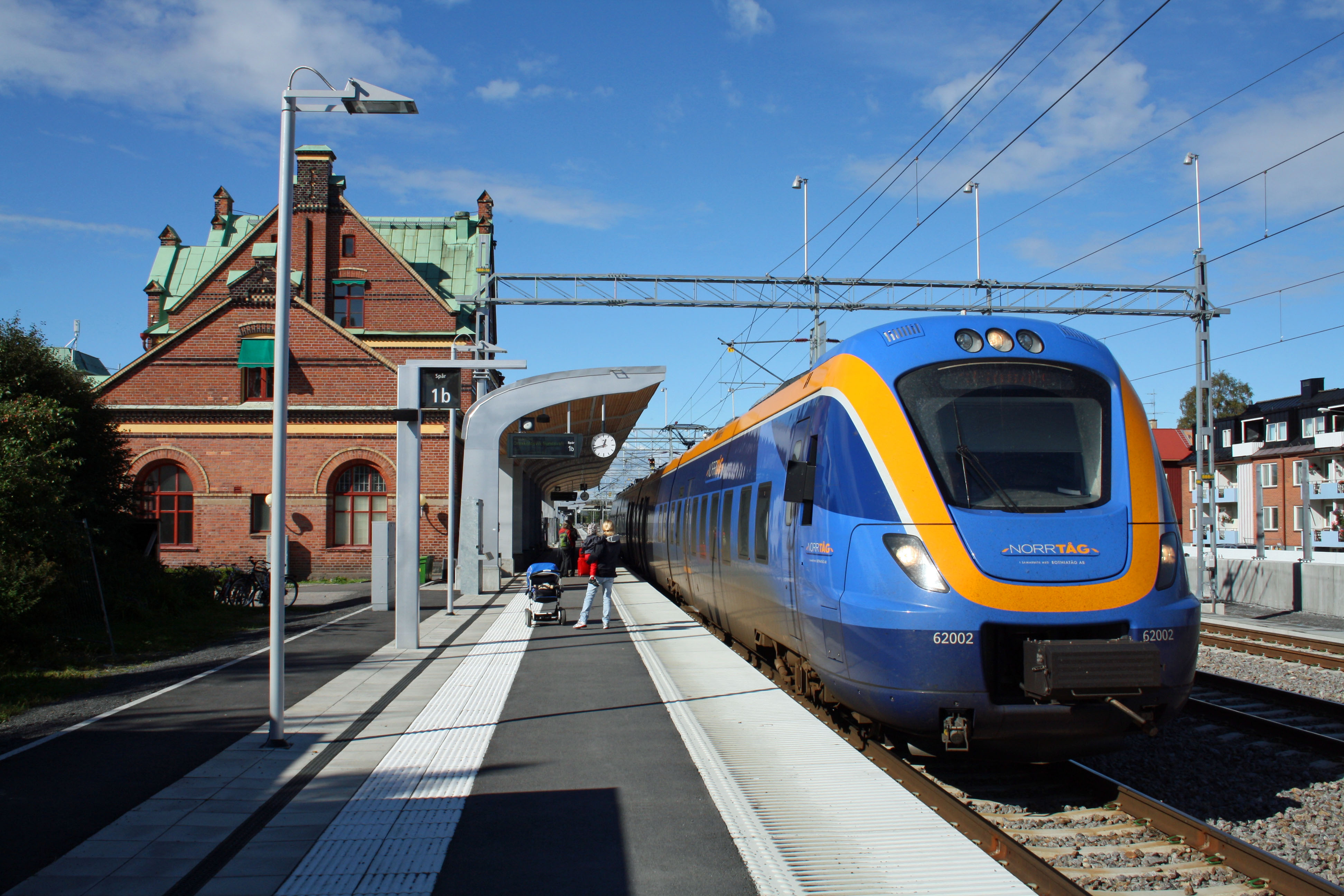
Norrtåg X62 train in Umeå, operated by Vy Tåg

Vy Tåg AB is a Swedish railway company that operates franchises in different parts of Sweden. The company was founded in 1999 by three former Statens Järnvägar employees and Småföretagsinvest/Fylkinvest, an investment company. In 2005 Norwegian State Railways (now Vy) purchased 34% of Svenska Tågkompaniet, and later on October 31, 2006 increased its ownership stake to 85%. In 2007 NSB purchased the rest of the company.

Previously known as Tågkompaniet or Svenska Tågkompaniet AB (The Swedish Train Company), the company was renamed Vy Tåg in 2019.

In December 2020, Vy Tåg assumed operation of passenger services in Värmland, Sweden under a nine-year contract with Värmlandstrafik. In December 2020, Vy Tåg also assumed operation of the Swedish Transport Administration state-supported overnight sleeper trains between Stockholm and Norrland, for four years.

The company has four franchise contracts:

- Norrtåg
- Värmlandstrafik
- X-Tåget (with X-Trafik)
- Krösatågen

== Rolling stock ==
=== Current ===
- 3 X11, mostly used between Umeå - Vännäs and Luleå-Boden.
- 2 X52 (Norrtåg), used all over the network, mostly Umeå-Luleå, Luleå-Haparanda and Luleå-Kiruna
- 12 X62 (Norrtåg), used between Sundsvall-Storlien and Sundsvall-Umeå
- 1 Y31 (diesel unit), used between Umeå-Lycksele as part of the line is not electrified.

=== Former ===
- 1 X20 (Stockholm-Furuvik) later moved to Tåg i Bergslagen, now stored in a private railway museum.
- 2 Y1 (Borlänge - Malung) later moved elsewhere when service was discontinued.
- 2 Y31 (Borlänge - Malung) later moved when service was discontinued.
