= Tornio–Haparanda railway =

Railway line between Finland and Sweden

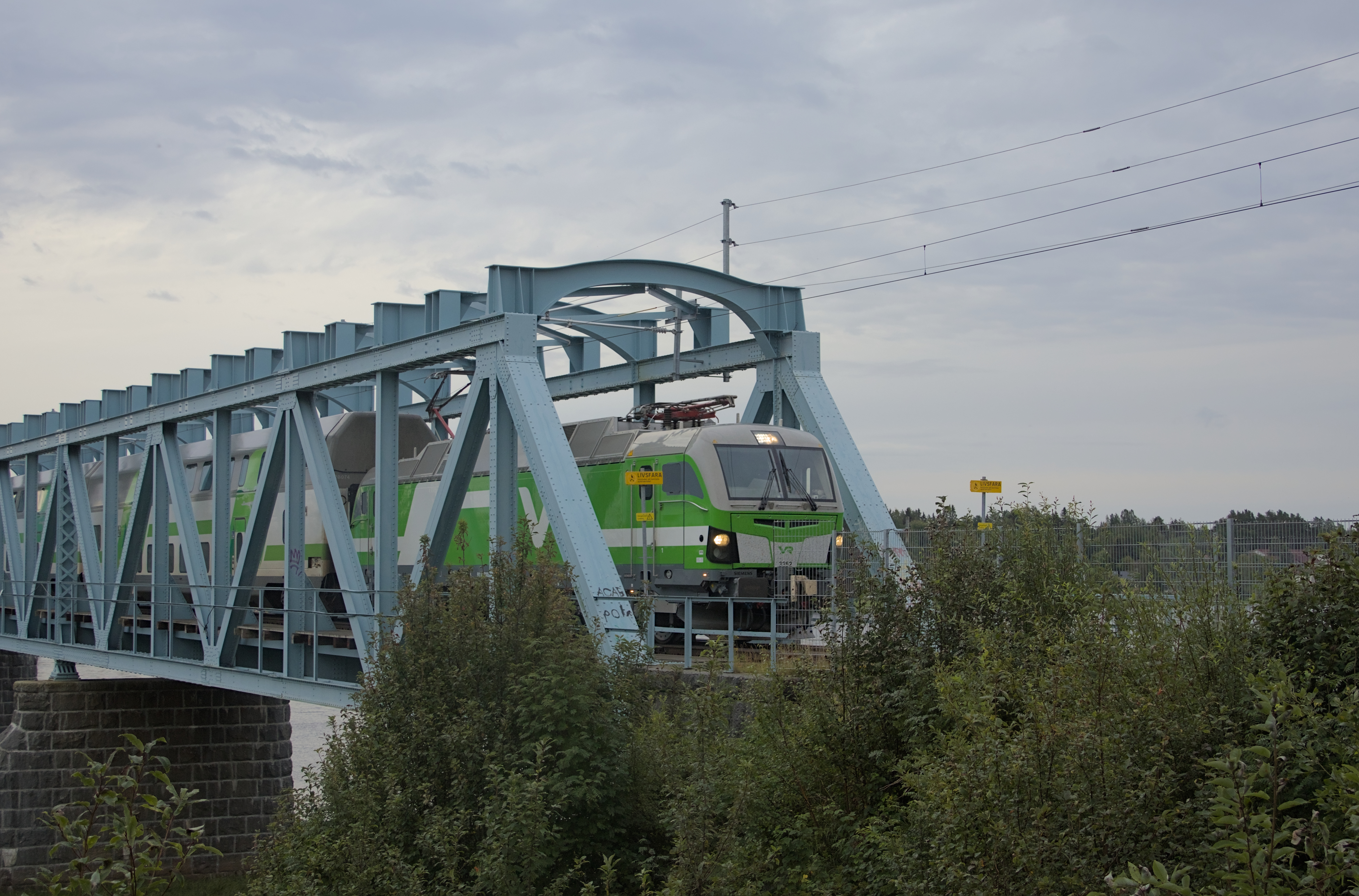
- VR Group class Sr3 locomotive pulling a passenger train to Haparanda

Overview
- Locale: Finland; Sweden
- Termini: Tornio; Haparanda
- Connecting lines: Haparanda Line; Oulu–Tornio railway; Kolari railway

History
- Opened: 1919

Technical
- Line length: 4 km (2.5 mi)
- Number of tracks: 1
- Track gauge: 1,524 mm (5 ft); 1,435 mm (4 ft 8 1/2 in)
- Electrification: 25 kV 50 Hz AC
- Signalling: JKV

The Tornio–Haparanda railway (Note: Finnish: Tornio–Haaparanta-rata; Swedish: Torneå–Haparanda-banan.) is a 4-kilometre (2.5 mi) railway line between Tornio, Finland and Haparanda, Sweden. The dual-gauge line opened in 1919 and is the only fixed connection between the Finnish 1,524 mm (5 ft) broad gauge and the European 1,435 mm (4 ft 8 1/2 in) standard gauge railway networks. It crosses the Torne River using the Torne River Railway Bridge.

== History ==
The railway first reached Tornio in 1903, with the railway station located on the eastern side of the Torne River. The Finnish State Railways originally placed a steamboat to operate between the station and the city predominantly located on an island in the river.

After the onset of the World War I in 1914, imperial officials in the then-Grand Duchy of Finland, which was a part of the Russian Empire, prioritised a rail connection to Sweden as an alternative to the enemy German-controlled Baltic Sea. Since the Haparanda Line in Sweden then only reached as far as Karungi, in 1914 work began to extend the railway up to Karunki on the Finnish side and traffic commenced in January 1915. Later that year, the Swedish Riksdag decided to extend the Swedish line all the way to Haparanda, and a treaty was signed with the Grand Duchy for a connection between the two networks in 1916. A temporary material ropeway was used to transport mail across the river between February 1917 and early 1918. The permanent railway connection was finished in 1918 and opened to passenger transport in 1919.

An 8.5 km (5.3 mi) branch line to the Port of Röyttä opened in 1928.

The Finnish State Railways terminated express train services to Tornio and Haparanda in the mid-1960s, with local services operated with Class Dm7 railbuses remaining until 1988. The Swedish State Railways terminated its services to Tornio in 1991 or 1992.

A Talgo gauge changer system was trialled in 1996–1999, but the system was deemed too expensive and was decommissioned. A similar German Rafil system was installed in 1998, but it has been unused since 2008.

The line, along with the remaining parts of the Oulu–Tornio railway, was electrified in 2023–2025. In 2022, a bogie exchange facility was built at the Finnish end.

Passenger service on the route was restored in August 2026 as the Finnish national railway operator VR Group was awarded a contract to operate two trains per day in each direction between Oulu and Haparanda.

== Description ==
=== Route ===
The railway line begins from Tornio station on the eastern side of the Torne River, on the south side of a wye connecting to the Oulu–Tornio and Kolari railway lines. The line then continues south and first crosses the Kirkkopudas tributary on a short bridge to a large island in the river delta. After a segment just short of 2 kilometres (1.2 mi), during which the Port of Röyttä branch line diverges, the line continues west and crosses main Torne River stream and the Finland–Sweden border using the Torne River Railway Bridge before reaching Haparanda station.

=== Infrastructure ===
On the two bridges and on the segment between them, the line runs as two interlaced track pairs, as the difference between the gauges is too narrow to allow a three-rail setup. Haparanda station has passenger platforms on both 1,435 mm and 1,524 mm tracks, but Tornio station only has a platform on a Finnish 1,524 mm track.

The Finnish Transport Infrastructure Agency acts as the railway infrastructure manager for the Finnish broad-gauge tracks, as well as for the dual-gauge track and standard gauge tracks at Tornio train yard, with the Swedish Transport Administration managing the standard gauge trackage at Haparanda station. The line is electrified with the Finnish 25 kV 50 Hz AC system and is equipped with the Finnish JKV train protection system.

The Port of Röyttä branch line has connections to several industrial sidings, is unelectrified and has 1,524 mm gauge track only.

A bogie exchange track at Tornio rail yard allows lifting up to six wagons at once for their bogies to be replaced. The lifting system also allows lifting a load up to 120 metres (390 ft) for the entire wagons to be swapped underneath.

== Services ==
Since 10 August 2026, VR Group serves Haparanda from Oulu with two train pairs per day, following €1,9 million in funding for the cross-border service in the 2026 Finnish state budget. Norrtåg services connect Haparanda to the rest of the Swedish railway network via Boden since 2021.

As of 2022, the line had an average of three weekly freight trains on the Port of Röyttä branch line and a single weekly freight train between Tornio and Haparanda.

== Future ==
The Finnish Transport Infrastructure Agency has proposed electrifying the Röyttä branch line. In 2022, the electrification of the branch line was estimated to cost €2 million, with an additional €5 million for a complete overhaul of the line.

The proposed Rail Nordica project would extend the standard gauge connection from the Tornio–Haparanda railway towards other parts of northern Finland. In 2025, the Orpo cabinet allocated €20 million for planning a 30-kilometre (19 mi) standard gauge line from Tornio to the junction station at Kemi, citing the needs of military mobility.
