= Tornio railway station =

Railway station in Tornio, Finland

Tornio
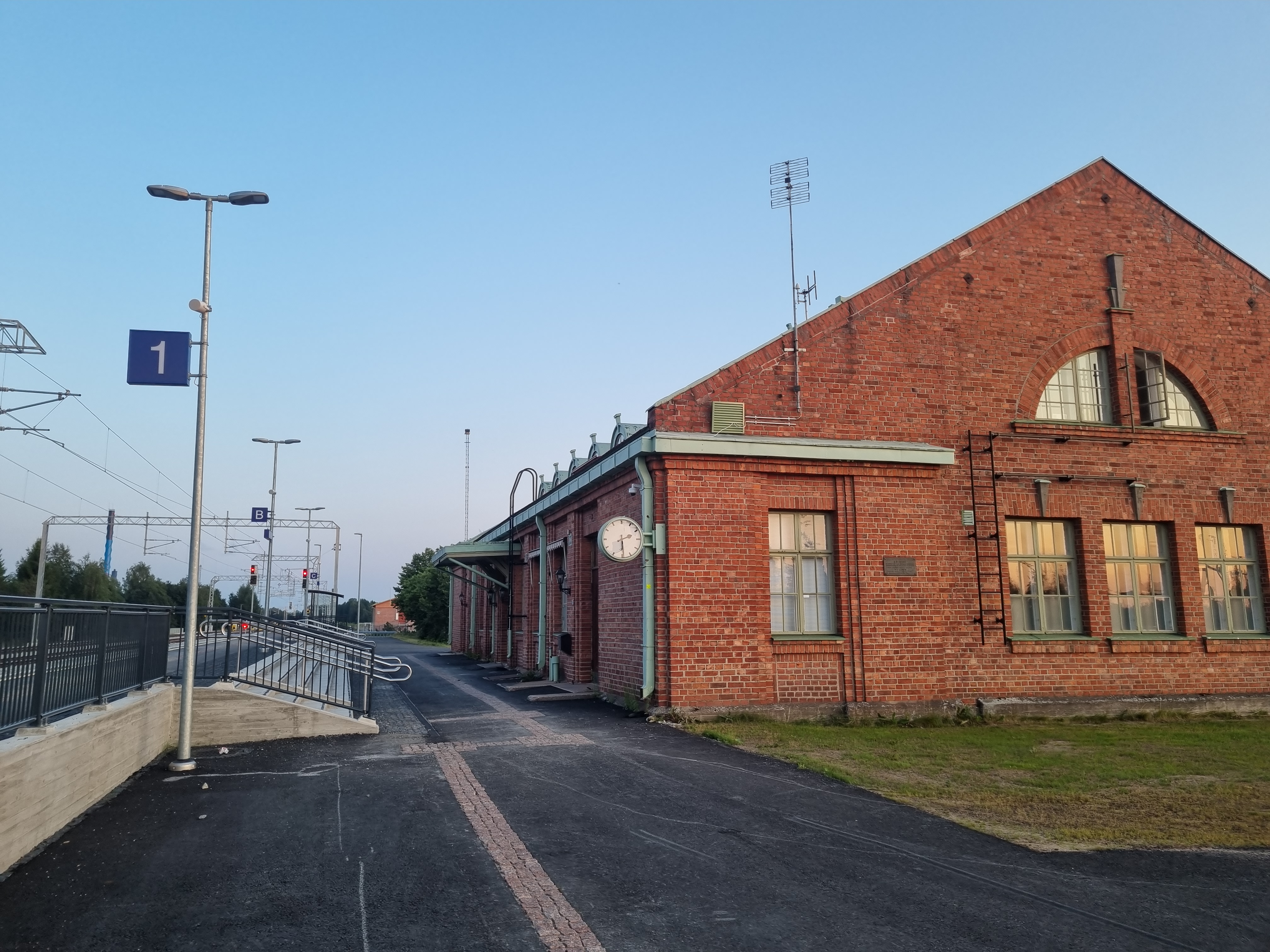
- Station building and platform in 2025

General information
- Coordinates: 65°50′44″N 24°09′48″E
- Owner: Finnish Transport Infrastructure Agency
- Lines: Oulu–Tornio railway; Tornio–Haparanda railway; Kolari railway

History
- Opened: 1903
- Electrified: 2025
Location

Tornio railway station (Finnish: Tornion rautatieasema) serves the city of Tornio, Finland, being located on the eastern side of the Torne River. The station is connected to the Oulu–Tornio railway, the Tornio–Haparanda railway and the Kolari railway and first opened in 1903.

== History ==
The Diet of Finland approved the construction of a railway from Oulu to Tornio in 1897, and the line opened in October 1903. To avoid building an expensive bridge, it was decided to locate the station on the eastern side of the Torne River; the Finnish State Railways placed a steamboat to operate between the station and the city predominantly located on an island in the river. The steamboat was purchased by the City of Tornio in 1926 and was finally withdrawn when a road bridge was completed in 1939.

After the onset of the World War I, a rail connection from Finland to Sweden was seen as a priority by Russian Empire (to which the Grand Duchy of Finland was then a part of) officials. The Swedish railway network at the time only extended as far as Karungi, so a decision was made in late 1914 to extend the railway from Tornio to the Karunki on the Finnish side of the Torne River, and the line opened to transport in 1915. However, in 1915 the Swedish line was extended to Haparanda and a treaty about the construction of the Tornio–Haparanda railway was signed later that year, with the line opening in 1919.

The wartime line to Karunki was repaired and extended to Kaulinranta by 1925 and further to Kolari in 1960–67.

The Finnish State Railways terminated express train services to Tornio and Haparanda in the mid-1960s, with local services operated with Class Dm7 railbuses remaining until 1988. When night train services onto the Kolari railway started in 1988, bypassing Tornio station, a new Tornio Northern halt was constructed on the wye between the three lines. The halt was closed due to safety concerns in 2004 and replaced by a new Tornio Eastern halt further east in 2008.

The original, wooden station building was replaced with a larger brick one in 1928, and further expanded in 1941. The goods station building was destroyed by arson in 2000.
