= Kolari railway =

Railway line in Finland

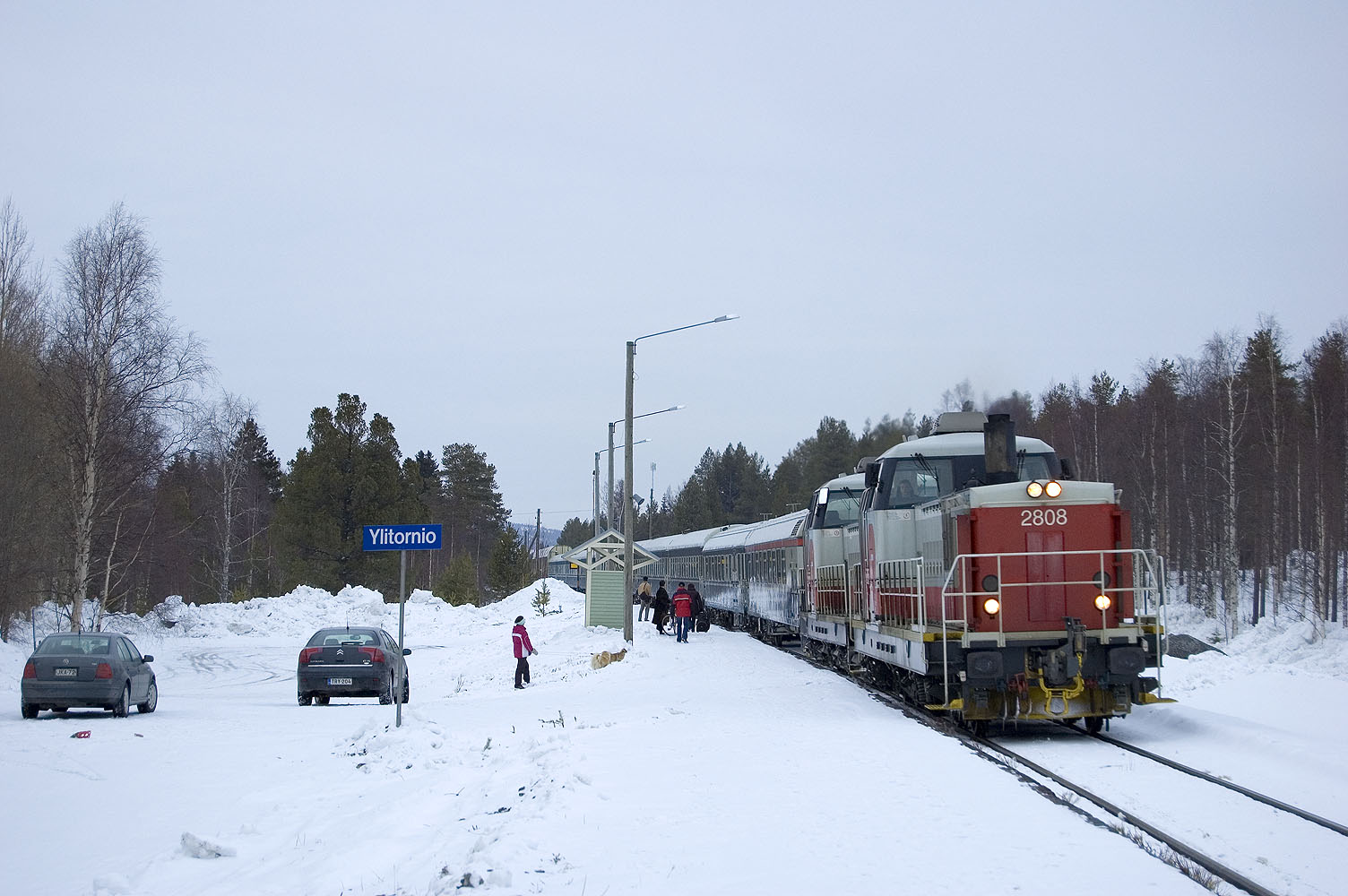
- Express night train stopping at Ylitornio station in 2009

Overview
- Locale: Finland
- Termini: Tornio; Kolari
- Connecting lines: Oulu–Tornio railway; Tornio–Haparanda railway

Technical
- Number of tracks: 1
- Track gauge: 1,524 mm (5 ft)

The Kolari railway (Finnish: Kolarin rata) is the northernmost railway in Finland and goes between Tornio and Kolari. It is 186 km (116 mi) long. The railway is not electrified and it has Finnish broad gauge. It connects to the Oulu–Tornio and Tornio–Haparanda railways in Tornio.

In January 1915, a railway opened from Tornio to Karunki, to provide a connection to the Haparanda Line which then ended at Karungi on the Swedish side and would only be extended to Haparanda later that year.

It was built in 1928 the first 79 kilometres (49 mi) Tornio–Kaulinranta and in 1967 the remaining 123 kilometres (76 mi) to Kolari. There are two mine railways, both 20 kilometres (12 mi), north of Kolari to the mines of Rautuvaara and Äkäsjokisuu. These mines were the primary reason to extend the railway north of Kaulinranta.

Different sections of the railway have opened at different times from 1922-1973:

Section	Opened	Length (km)
Tornio–Kukkola	24 March 1922	17
Kukkola–Karunki	1 January 1923	10
Karunki–Korpikylä	1 January 1926	9
Korpikylä–Aavasaksa	1 November 1927	34
Aavasaksa–Kaulinranta	1 September 1928	7
Kaulinranta–Pello	3 January 1964	42
Pello–Sieppijärvi	1 December 1965	43
Sieppijärvi–Kolari	1 December 1966	21
Kolari–Niesa–Äkäsjoki	1 September 1967	17
Niesa–Rautuvaar	1 April 1973	10

There were in 2009-2010 short term plans to extend the railway 15 kilometres (9.3 mi) from Äkäsjokisuu to the new Tapuli mine in Sweden, but the mining company decided to use Narvik as shipping port instead. There are also suggestions on extending it to Skibotn or Tromsø in Norway.

Sleeper trains operate between Helsinki and Kolari, departing Helsinki at 18:14 and arriving at Kolari at 08:47 the next day. The train also carries road vehicles from Pasila station to Kolari.
