= Haparanda Line =

Railway line in Sweden

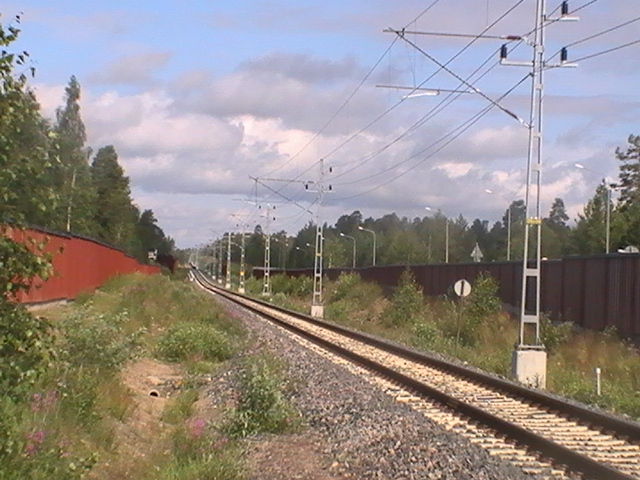
- New Haparanda Line at Kalix.

Overview
- Owner: Swedish Transport Administration
- Locale: Norrbotten County, Sweden
- Termini: Boden C; Haparanda
- Connecting lines: Iron Ore Line; Main Line Through Upper Norrland; Tornio–Haparanda railway

Technical
- Number of tracks: 1
- Track gauge: 1,435 mm (4 ft 8 1/2 in)
- Electrification: 15 kV 16.7 Hz AC
- Signalling: ETCS

The Haparanda Line (Swedish: Haparandabanan) is a 165-kilometer (103 mi) long railway line between Boden and Haparanda in Sweden. From Haparanda, a 3-kilometer (1.9 mi) rail line continues to Torneå on the Finnish side of the Finland–Sweden border. The line is the only Swedish railway to the Finnish border.

The single track line was used exclusively by freight traffic between 1992 and 2021, during which time it was necessary to use buses from Luleå to the Haparanda bus station, with onward connections to Kemi in Finland. Passenger service began again on the 1 April 2021, operated by Norrtåg.

== History ==
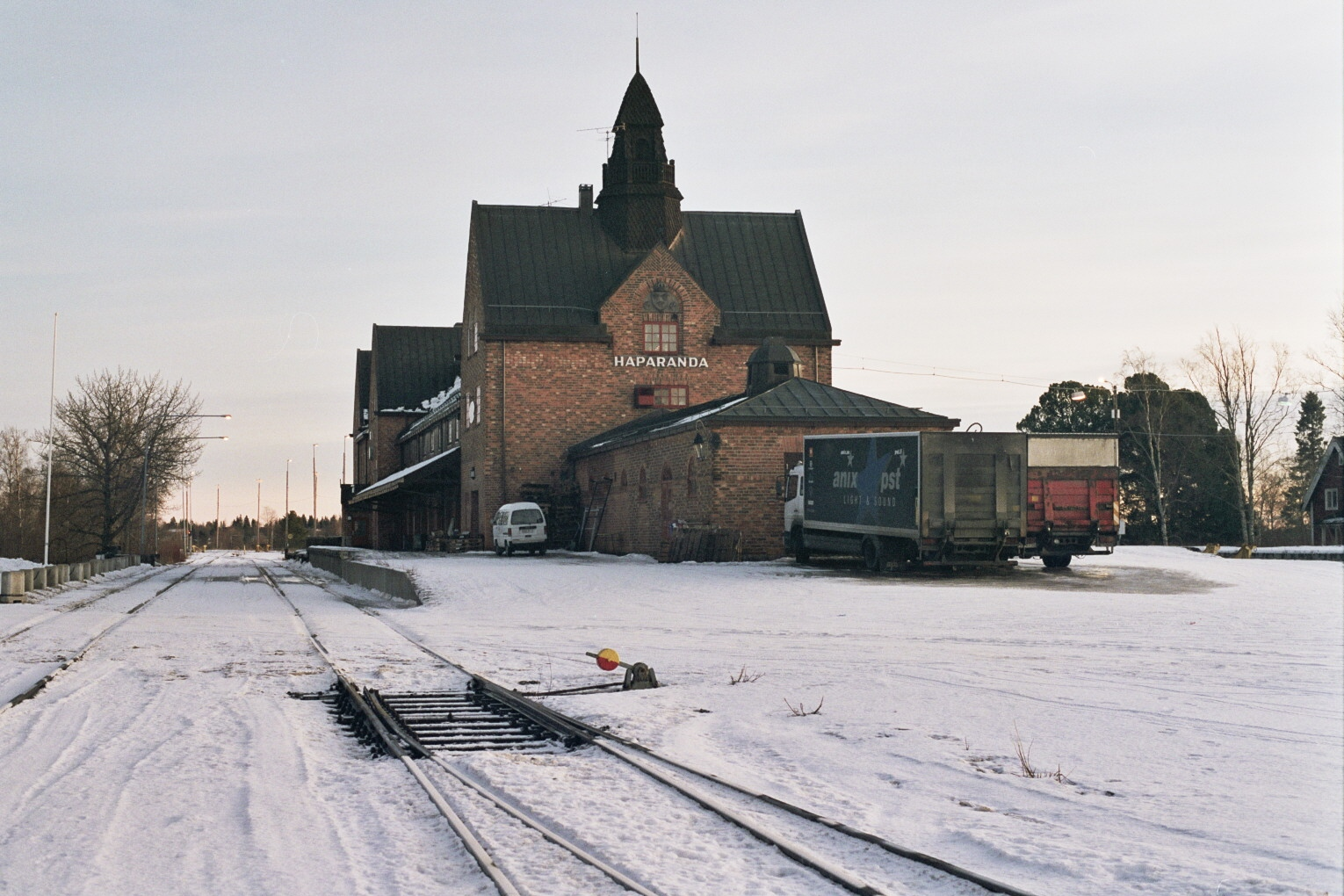
Haparanda railway station

The railway from Boden to Haparanda was built in several sections over the course of 17 years. The first segment to be completed was Buddbyn to Niemisel in 1900, followed by the segment Niemisel to Morjärv in 1902. The railway did not reach Lappträsk until in 1910, and the Swedish–Finland border at Karungi on the west bank of Torne River was not reached until 1913.

Karungi was to become a junction, and the railway reaching northward to Övertorneå was built in 1914, followed by the southern Karungi to Haparanda line in 1915. The only open railway connection between Germany and Russia during World War I went here. Lenin traveled here in 1917 (Note: See the Vladimir Lenin article for more details.) to organise the Russian Revolution. The railway bridge over the Torne River between Haparanda and Tornio was placed in service in 1919. Before that passengers had to walk or use horse carriages the short distance between the cities. In order to cross the river which goes east of Tornio, they had to take a ferry boat, or in the winter use a road on the ice, as the road bridge was built later.

The station building was finished in 1918 and was dimensioned based on the traffic during the war. All international travellers had to change trains here because of the break-of-gauge, and had to go through passport check. During World War II, the traffic was dense again since the Baltic Sea was not safe. It is one of Sweden's largest station buildings but only used to some extent for rail purposes (since 2021).

The branch line from Morjärv towards Kalix was built in 1961. Traffic between Karungi and Övertorneå was discontinued in 1984, and the line was torn up soon thereafter. In 1986 a more direct route was built between Övermorjärv and Östra Flakaträsk, bypassing the Räktjärv station. The old line along with one bridge was demolished soon after the new shortcut was built; however, the old line is still visible on many Swedish maps.

Passenger traffic ceased in 1992. The connection to the Finnish trains was already broken in 1988 when the Haparanda–Tornio–Kemi trains were discontinued. There was a test with tourist traffic between Boden–Haparanda in the summer of 2000.

During the period 2007 to 2012, the line from Buddbyn (near Boden Central Station) to Morjärv and Kalix was upgraded, and an alternate route from Kalix to Haparanda was built. The line was electrified in the same time. The old line from Morjärv over Karungi to Haparanda was abandoned in 2012. In 2013, the European Train Control System (level 2) signalling system was introduced on the line.

In 2020, Norrtåg applied to start passenger services from Luleå and Boden to Haparanda. Construction on platforms for passengers had begun by May 2020 in Haparanda and Kalix. The platforms were completed by January 2021. Passenger services restarted on 1 April 2021, including one weekday round trip to/from Umeå. A new railway station was built in Kalix.

Due to issues with train coverage, supplemental buses were proposed between Haparanda and Luleå. There were problems with delays and cancelations for passenger train services; it was reported that only six out of ten scheduled trains in 2022 ran.

== See also ==
- North Bothnia Line
