= Rail Nordica =

Railway project in Finland and Sweden

Rail Nordica is a project to design and construct European 1,435 mm (4 ft 8 1/2 in) standard gauge railway links from Finland to Sweden. The current Finnish railway network is uses Russian 1,524 mm (5 ft) broad gauge tracks.

The Lapland region of Finland has become central in security policy, and the weak points of logistics that have been revealed by NATO membership in Finland emphasize the need for Rail Nordica. The stated aim of Rail Nordica is to improve military mobility and security of supply, to strengthen the operating conditions of the Nordic countries business and to meet the needs of NATO.

Planning commenced in 2025 for a standard-gauge connection from the end of the cross-border Tornio–Haparanda railway at Tornio to Kemi. Construction costs for a connection to Oulu are estimated at over EUR 1.5 billion.

The project will receive EUR 20 million for the years 2026–2029 from the Finnish State Public Budget, and the Finnish Transport Infrastructure Agency is leading the planning. Rail Nordica is also linked to the requirements of the EU's Trans-European Transport Network (TEN-T) and seeks to utilize EU funding, especially from the point of view of military mobility.

== See also ==
- Rail transport in Finland
