= Haparanda railway station =

Railway station in Haparanda, Sweden

Haparanda station
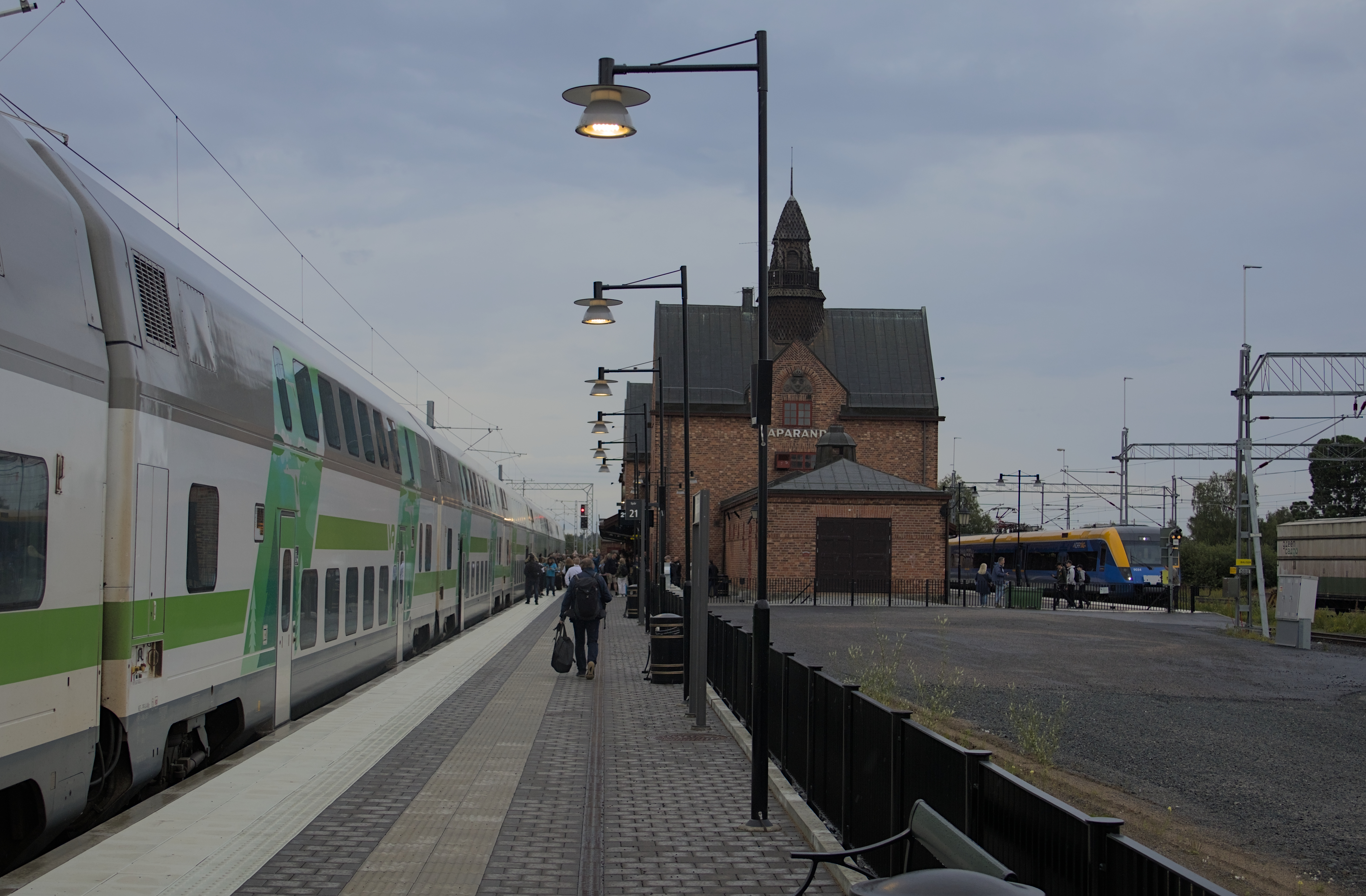
- Finnish and Swedish trains at the station, August 2026

General information
- Location: Järnvägsgatan 21; Haparanda; Sweden
- Coordinates: 65.828056°N 24.131111°E
- Lines: Haparanda Line; Tornio–Haparanda railway
- Train operators: Norrtåg

Construction
- Structure type: At-grade
- Accessible: Yes
- Architect: Folke Zettervall
Location

Haparanda station is a railway station in Haparanda, Sweden. The station is connected to Boden and the rest of the Swedish railway network via the Haparanda Line, as well as to the Finnish railway network via the Tornio–Haparanda railway. Trains at the station are operated by the Swedish operator Norrtåg and Finnish national railway operator VR Group.

Designed by Swedish State Railways chief architect Folke Zettervall, planning for the station was underway by 1915. It served as a major transit hub for passengers and goods between Sweden, Finland, and Russia during both World Wars. After decades of declining traffic and regional train closures, the station became the eastern terminus of the newly electrified Haparanda Line in 2013.

== Location ==
It is situated on a small hill at the southern ends of the Västra Esplanaden and Stationsgatan streets in Haparanda.

== History ==
The station was conceived as a trade gateway between Sweden and the Russian Empire via what was then the Grand Duchy of Finland. In 1915, a bill was presented to the Riksdag proposing a rail connection between the Swedish and Finnish railway networks. The plan called for designating Haparanda as a full border station, and extending the line from the planned station south of the town across the Torne River to the Finnish side. The bill requested an appropriation of 1 million SEK. It was designed by Folke Zettervall, chief architect for Swedish State Railways.

During World War I, the station served as a major transit hub, with refugees, Red Cross workers, diplomats, soldiers, smugglers passing through. In the final stages of World War II, it also played a role in receiving refugees from northern Finland. When German forces retreated in 1944, thousands of Finnish civilians crossed the border into Sweden by way of the station.

After the wars, traffic through Haparanda station declined. Many of the station's surrounding businesses had closed by the early 1980s. Around the same time, passenger transport was cut back in the region. Finnish Railways (VR) stopped offering passenger service to Kemi in 1988, and in 1992, passenger service was also ended on the Boden–Haparanda Line.

Work on a new, electrified Haparanda Line began in 2006. It was inaugurated at Haparanda station on 15 January 2013, in a ceremony led by Catharina Elmsäter-Svärd, then the Minister for Infrastructure. However, one 20 km (12 mi) stretch of track on the Finnish side towards Laurila was not electrified, requiring a train change at the border. One challenge was the incompatible track gauges between Sweden and Finland. In 2021, the Finnish government approved electrification between Haparanda and Laurila, signaling the possible return of cross-border traffic after over 30 years without. In November 2025, plans were announced to resume passenger train services between Haparanda and Finland, and funding was confirmed later that month, Cross-border services began on 10 August 2026.

== Services ==
Haparanda serves as the eastern terminus for the Haparanda Line. Passenger trains operated by Norrtåg go from Haparanda to Kalix, Luleå, and Boden. In Boden, connections are available to southern destinations such as Umeå, Sundsvall, and Stockholm, as well as northward to Gällivare and Kiruna. Starting 10 August 2026, VR serves Haparanda with two daily round-trips from Oulu via Kemi, Tornio East and Tornio. Local bus services in Haparanda also connect with the station.
