= Liakanjoki =

River in Tornio, Finland

Coordinates: 66°50′N 024°13′E

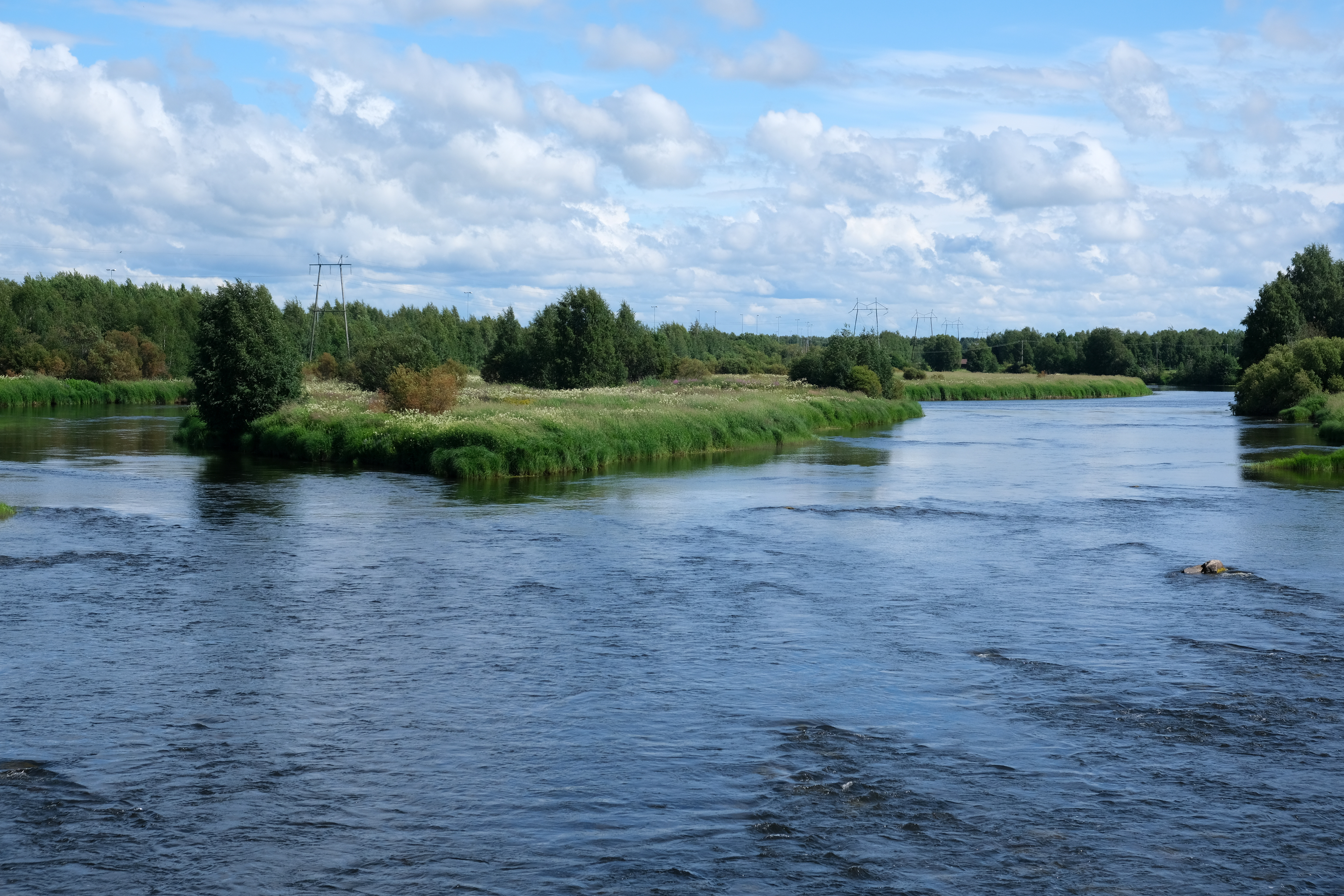

Liakanjoki is a river in Finland. It is a distributary of Torne River. It departs from the main river in Karunki, Tornio.
