= Torne River Railway Bridge =

Tornio River Railway Bridge
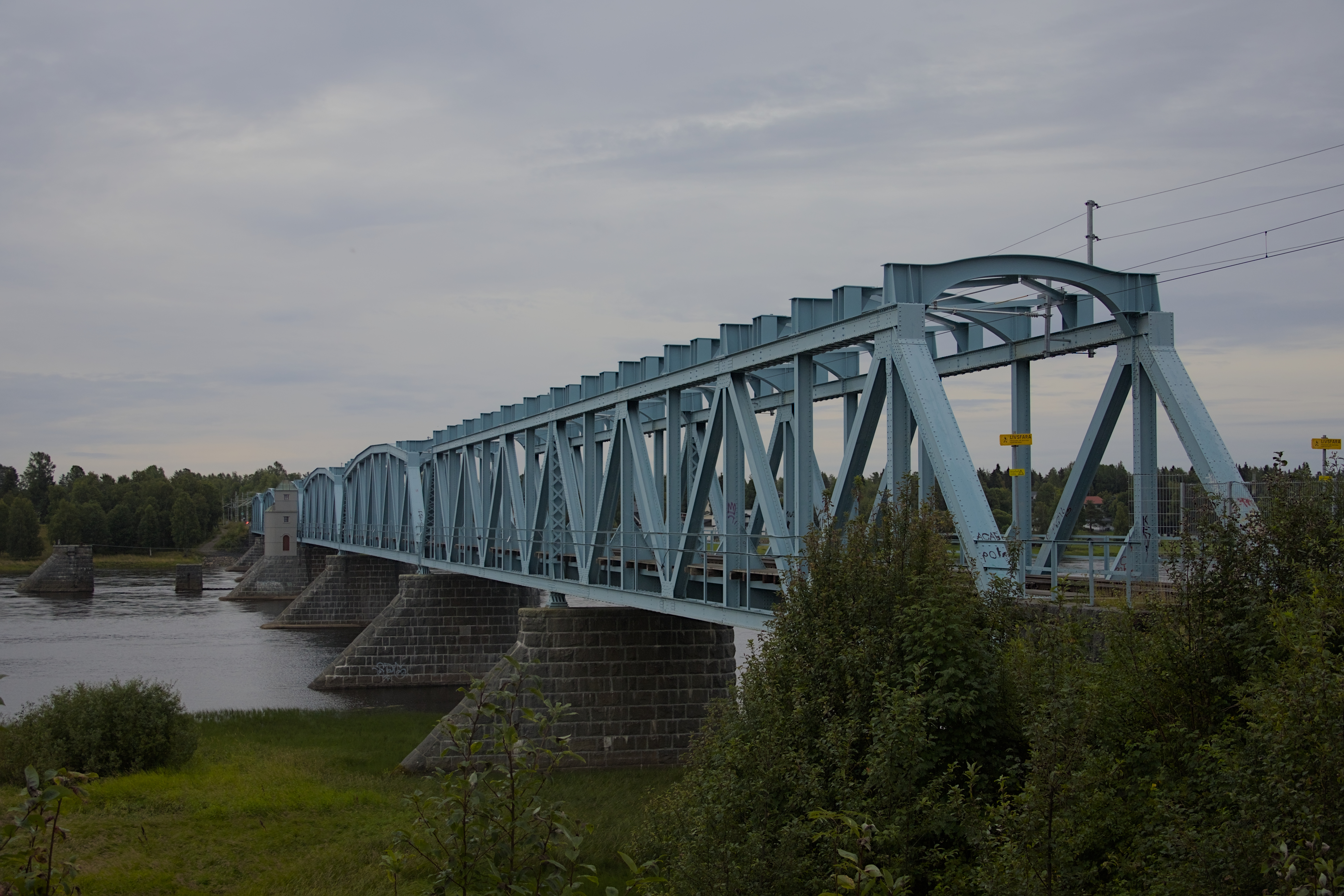
- Coordinates: 65.8278°N 24.1495°E
- Carries: Tornio–Haparanda railway
- Crosses: Torne River
- Locale: Tornio, Finland; Haparanda, Sweden

Characteristics
- Design: Truss bridge
- Total length: 405 metres (1,329 ft)

History
- Opened: 1919

Location
- Interactive map of Tornio River Railway Bridge

The Torne River Railway Bridge is a dual gauge railway bridge on the Tornio–Haparanda railway between Haparanda, Sweden and Tornio, Finland; the bridge can be used by the 1524mm gauge trains of Finland, as well the 1435mm gauge trains used in Sweden. A temporary ice river track was built over the Torne River in 1917.

The current bridge was opened in 1919 and was the first direct connection between the towns until the road bridge opened in 1939. It was jointly built by the governments of Sweden and Finland, and by the railway company. A small aerial lift was built in 1916 over the river to transport mail, because during parts of the year the ice was too strong for boats and too weak or too split up for walking. This was the main gateway between Western Europe and the Russian Empire, which Finland was a part of until 1917, during the First World War. The aerial lift was removed when the railway bridge was operating.

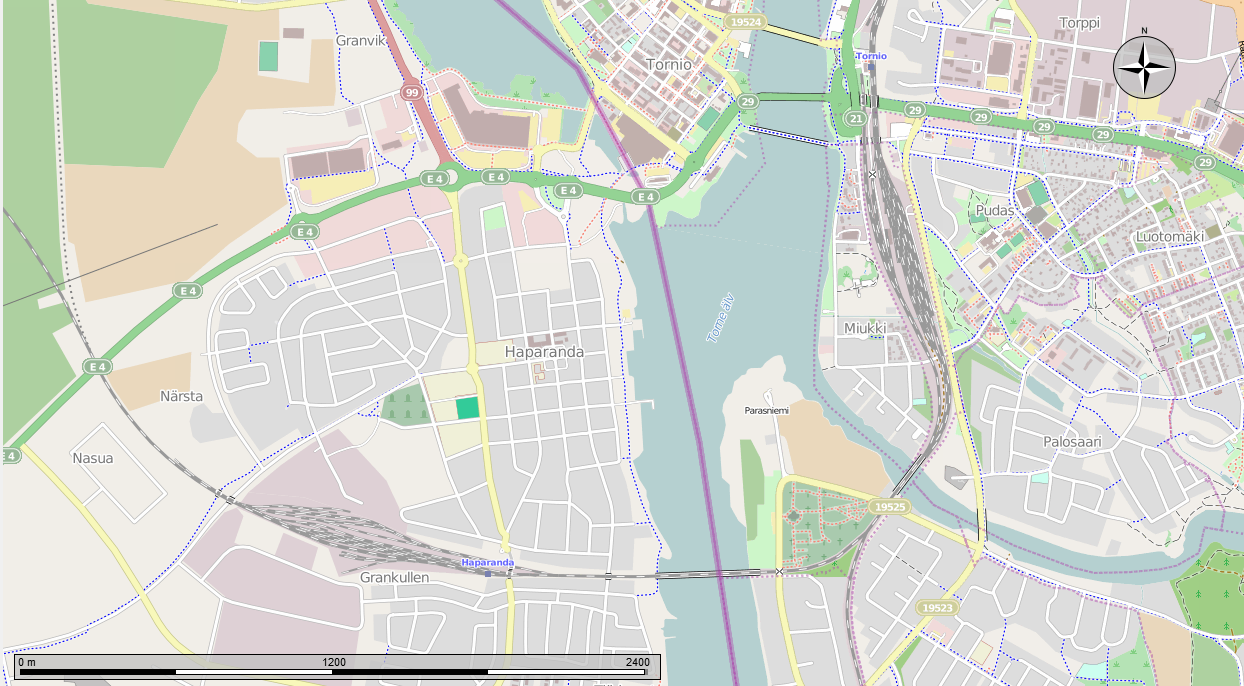
Map showing the bridge and the railway marshalling yards. Sweden is at the left, Finland at the right.

The bridge is painted white from the Finnish side to the international border, and is blue from there to the Swedish side. The dual gauge tracks continue over the bridge into railway marshalling yard in either country (a Swedish-gauge marshalling yard in Tornio, and a Finnish-gauge yard in Haparanda). Passenger trains also went over the bridge but have been withdrawn; the Finnish Railways ended passenger traffic to the Swedish side gradually between 1984 and 1988 while the last SJ passenger train left Haparanda in 1992. A train between Boden, Sweden and Haparanda was tried in the early 2000s, but was stopped as it was unprofitable. As of 2014, Green Cargo is shunting in Tornio, usually once or twice a day on weekdays and Saturdays. VR will shunt in Haparanda, if necessary. Current cross-border traffic consists of containerized goods and freight from Outokumpu. Cross-border freight transport is expected to increase on the Swedish side with construction of the new railway line between Kalix and Haparanda.

The bridge was electrified in 2025, together with the railway from Laurila in Finland. The bridge was also given a slightly higher internal height during the same project.

== Technical details ==
The bridge is 405 metres (1,329 ft) long, and was built as a swing bridge (although it was seldom used as such) which rotated in the horizontal plane around the central pillar. The bridge was converted to a fixed structure on October 22, 1985.

== Gallery ==
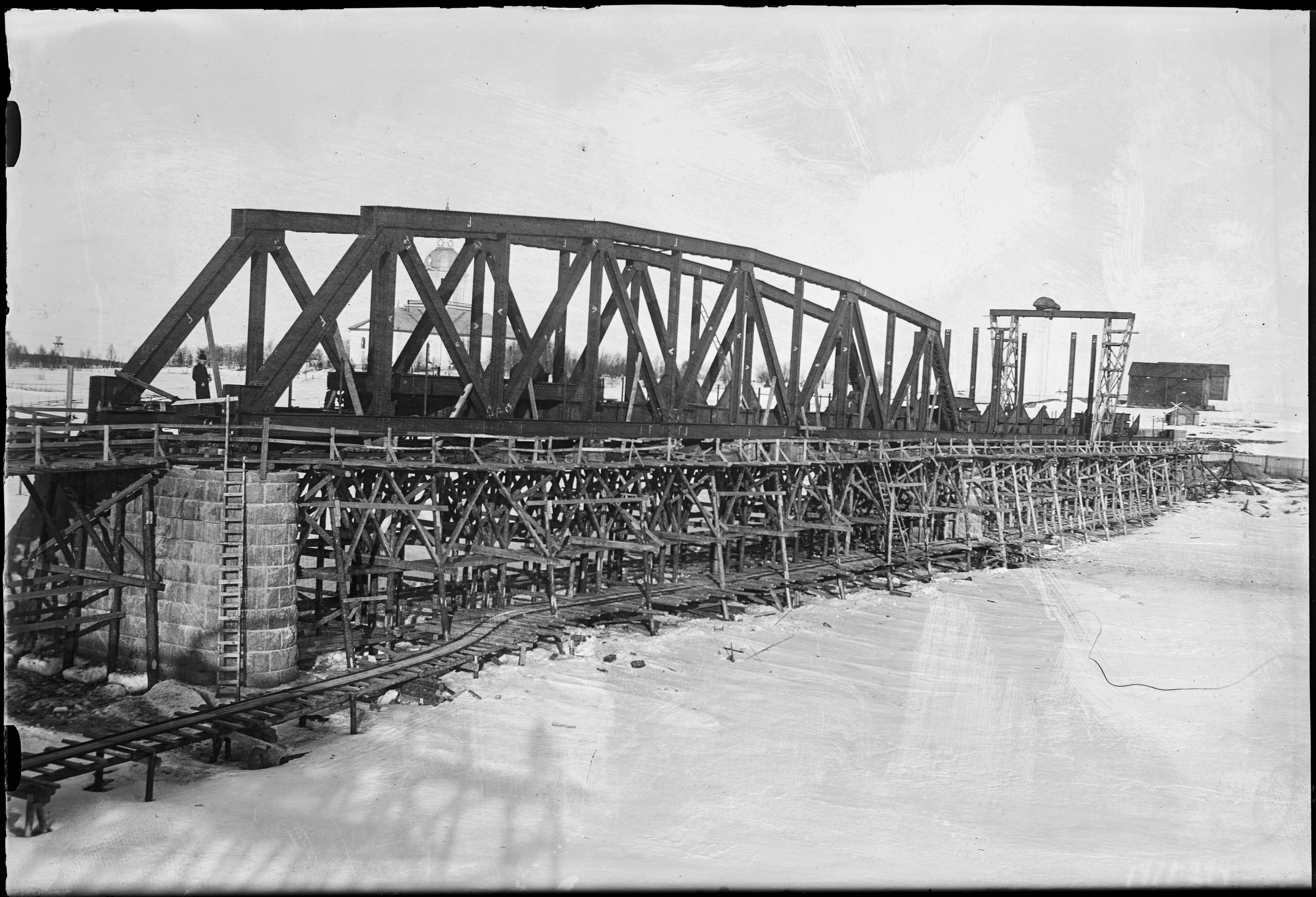
The bridge under construction.

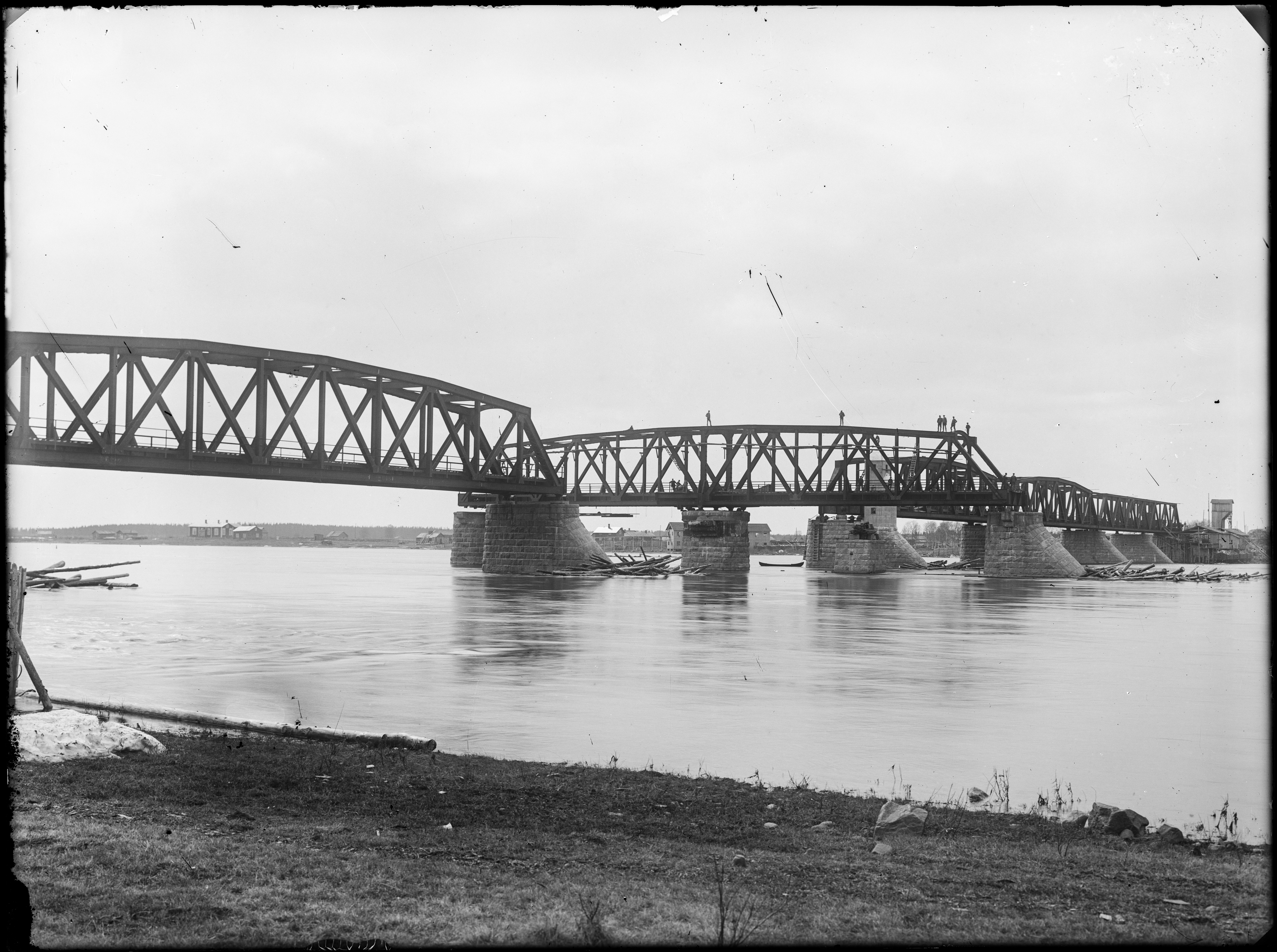
The bridge under construction.

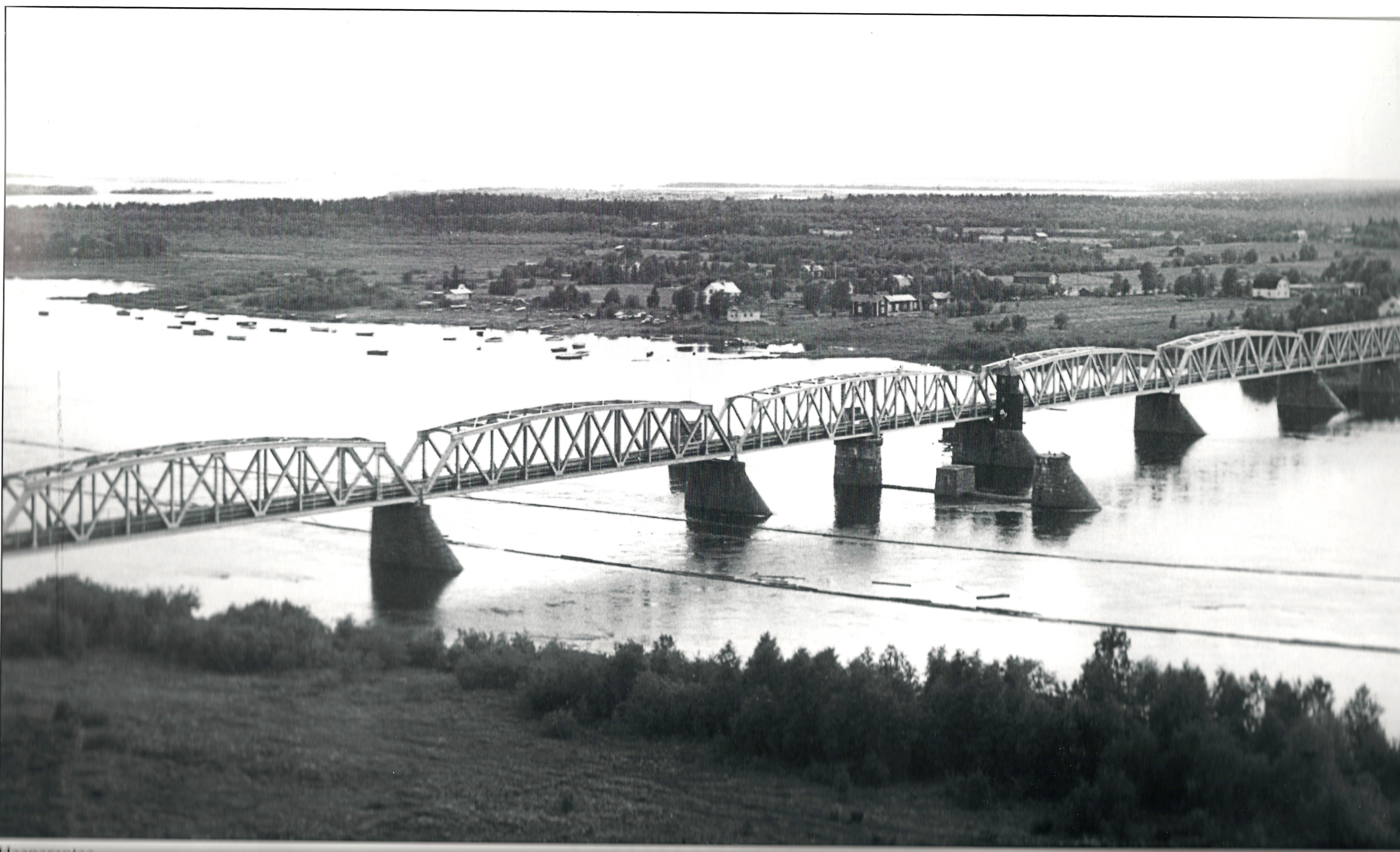
Railway bridge on 1930s

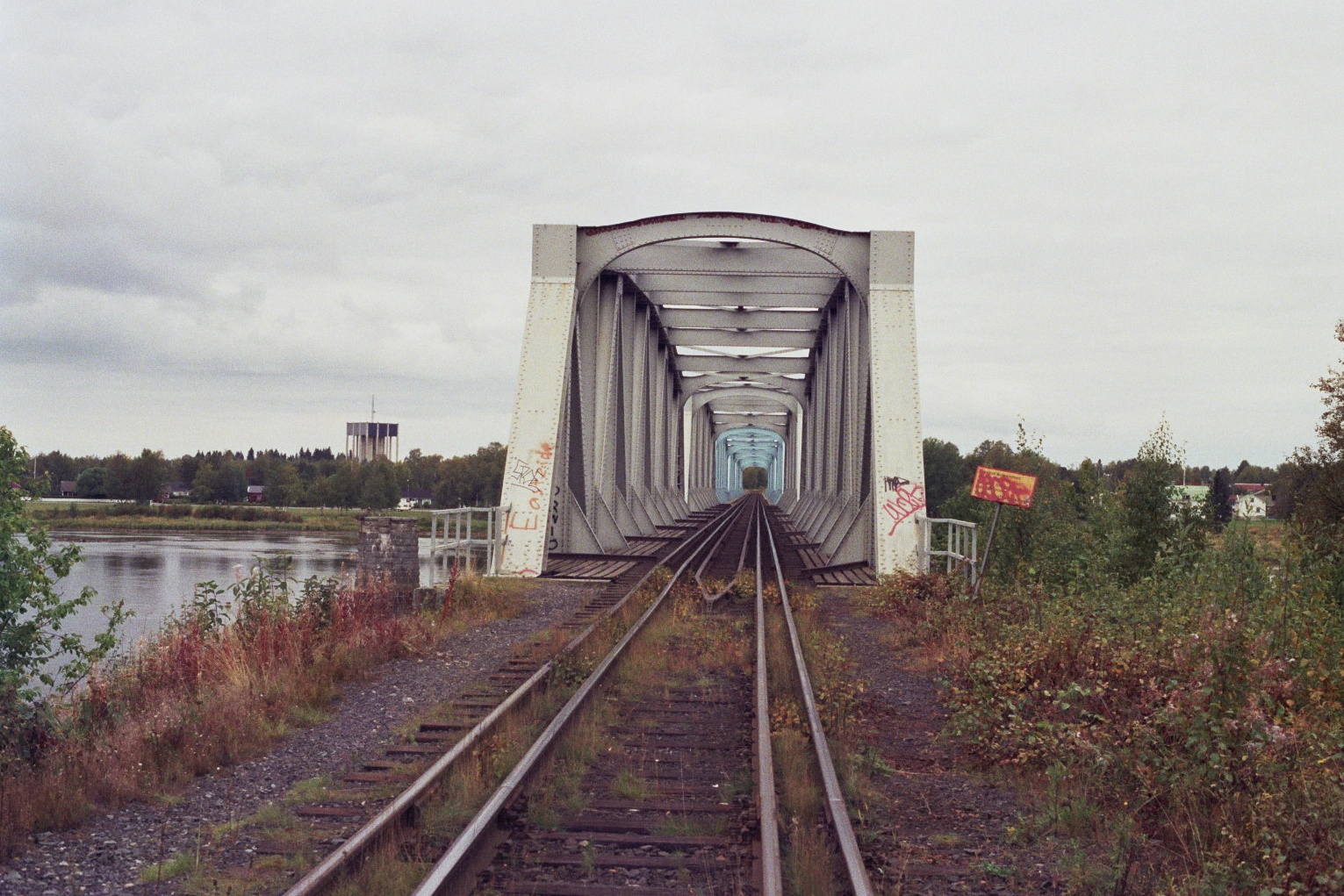
Bridge seen from the Finnish side. Note the dual track gauges

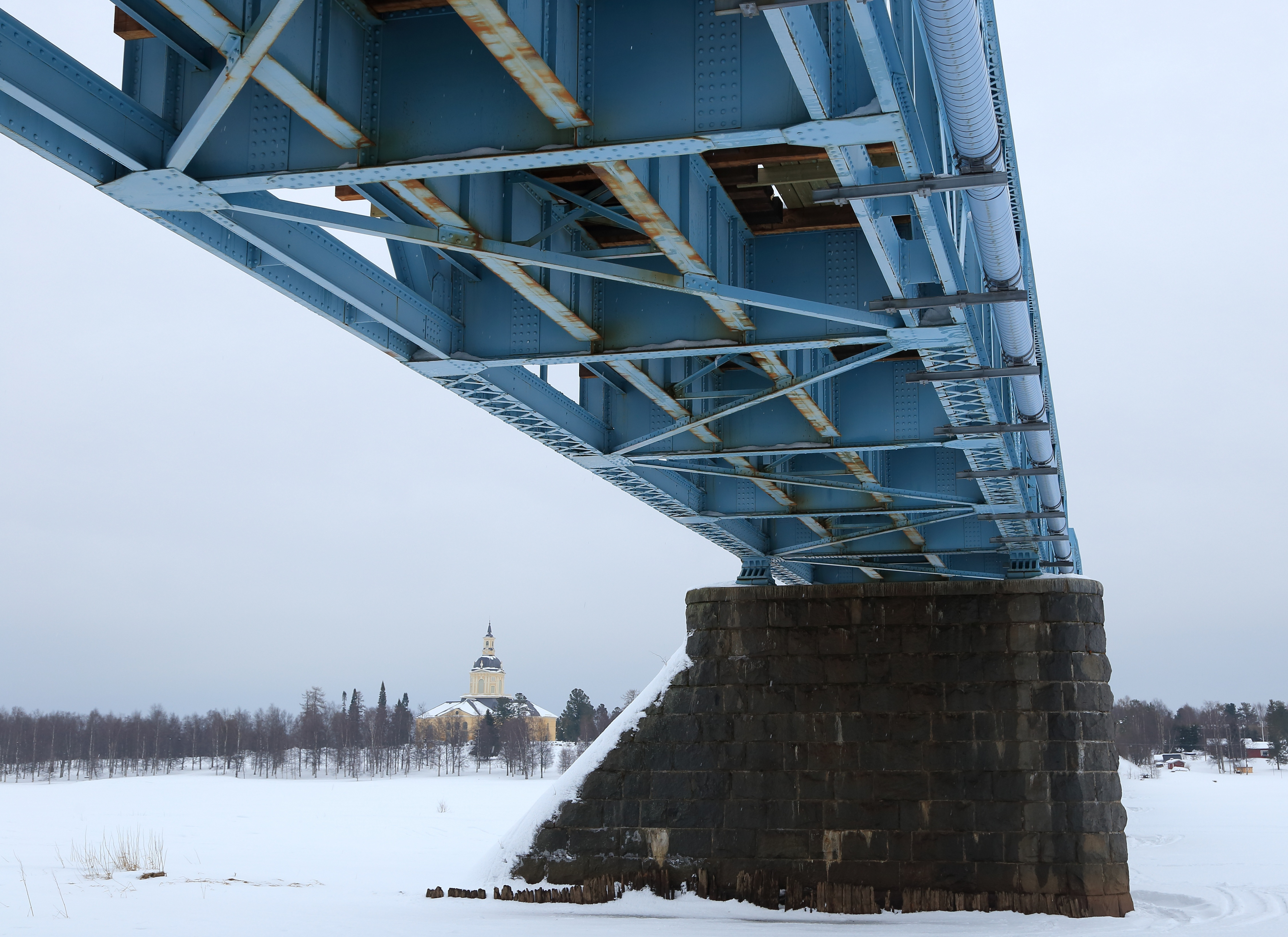
under the railway bridge

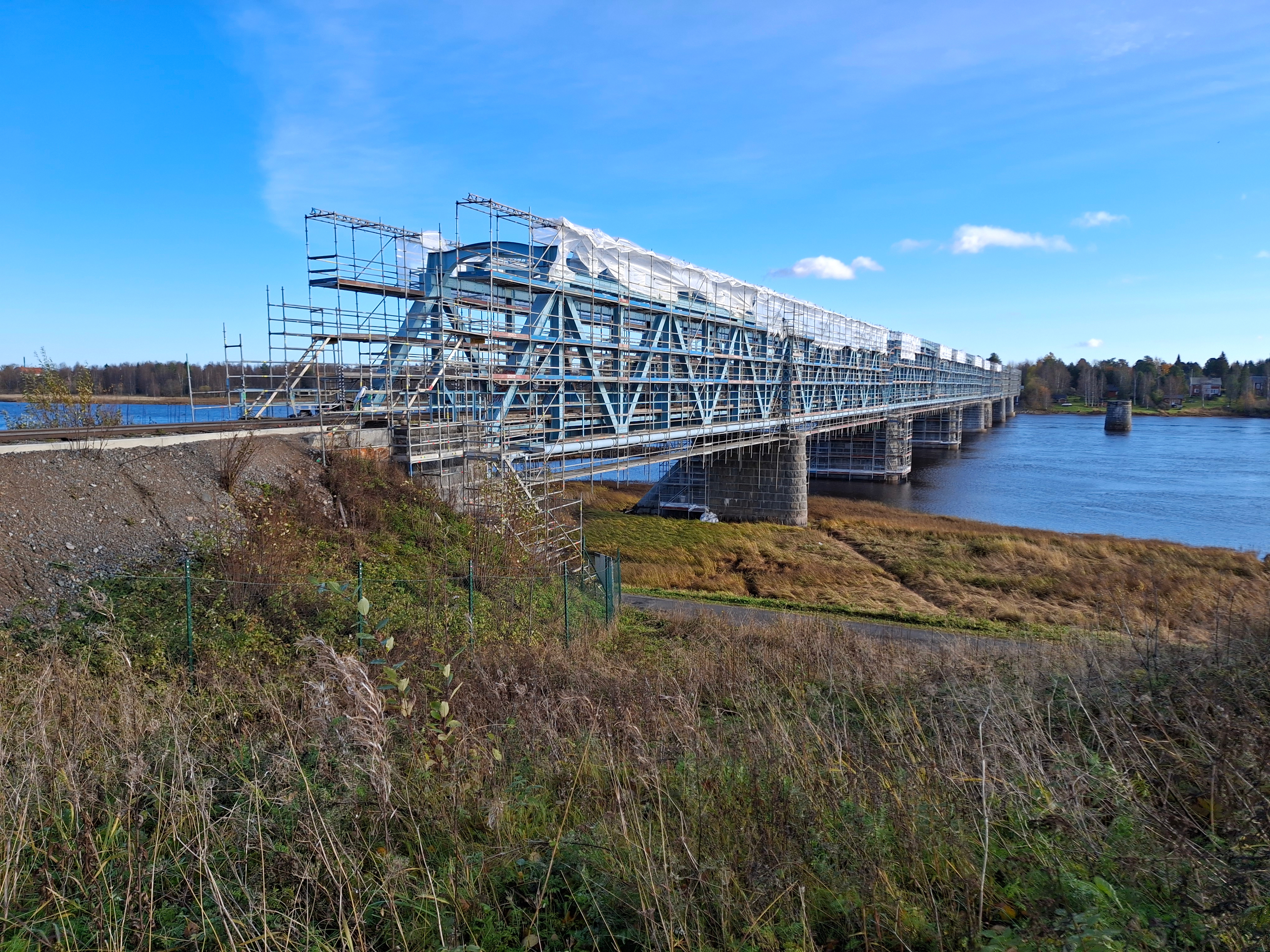
Railway bridge under renovation in summer 2024

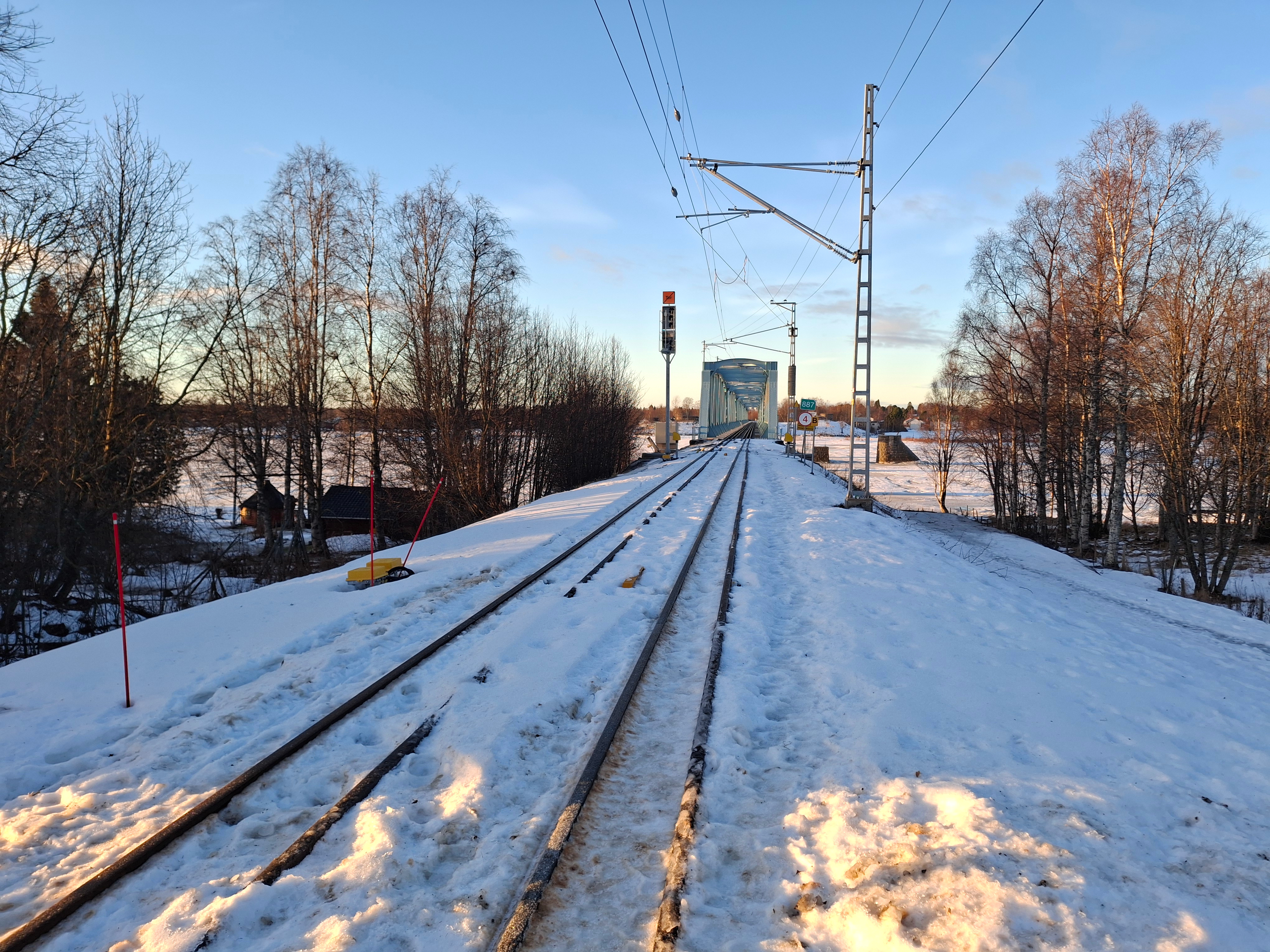
Railway bridge after renovation in winter 2025

== See also ==
- List of international bridges
