= Karunki =

- Karungin kunta Karungi kommun
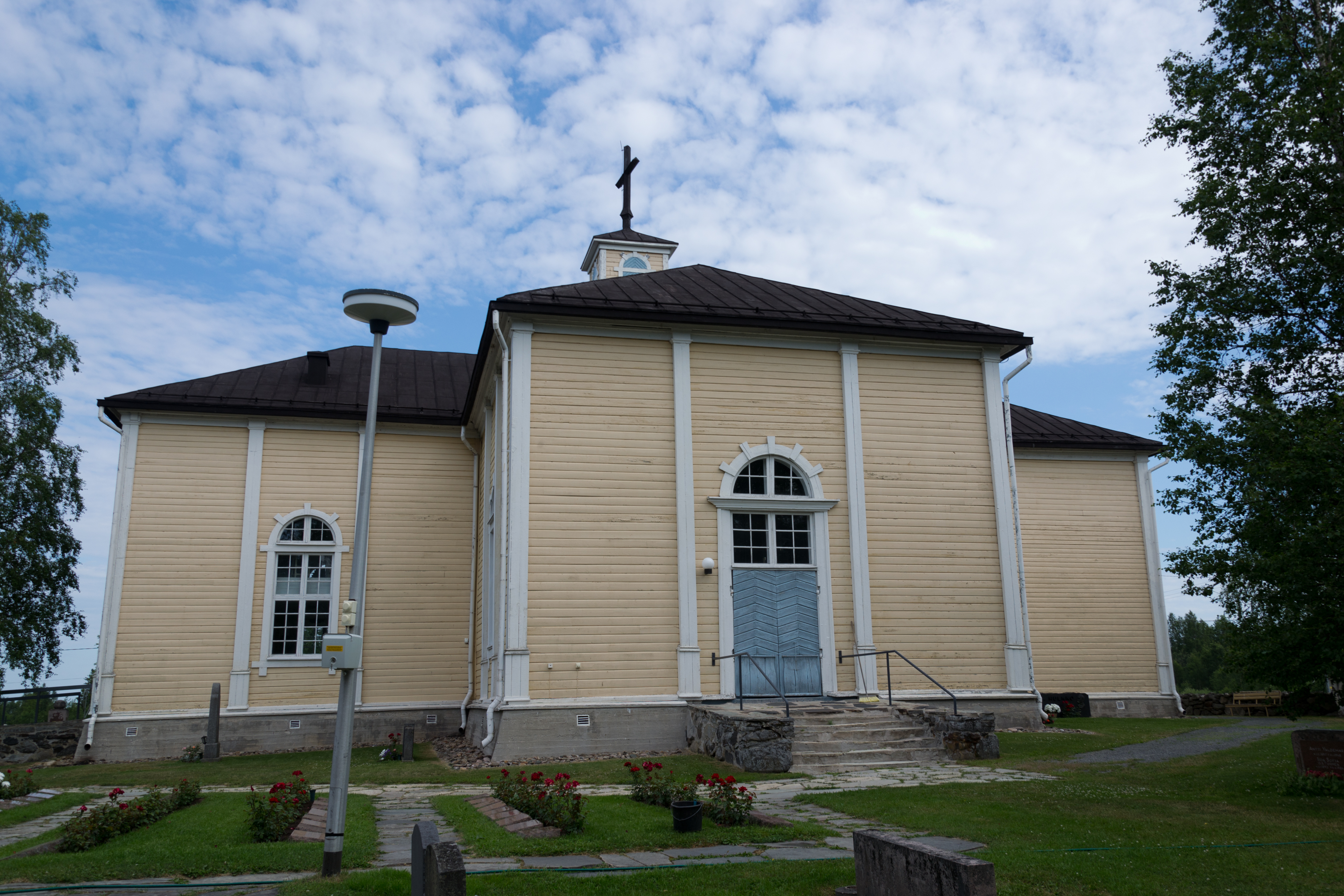
- Karunki Church

- Coat of arms

- Location within Finland
- Coordinates: 66°02′N 24°1′E
- Country: Finland
- Province: Lapland
- Region: Lapland
- Municipality: Tornio

Population (31 December 2012)
  - Total: 483
- Time zone: UTC+2 (EET)
  - Summer (DST): UTC+3 (EEST)

Karunki is an urban area and a former municipality that is situated in Lapland, Finland with 483 inhabitants in 2012.

Karunki is located at the Torne river on the border of Finland and Sweden. On the Swedish side of the river, opposite to Karunki, the village Karungi (pop 232) is located. There is no bridge, but crossing the river is done by boat or on the ice. These two villages have a common history since before the national border was drawn in the river, through the village, in 1809.

The wooden church of Karunki is designed by Finnish architect Anton Wilhelm Arppe. It was built in 1815–1817.

Karunki joined with Tornio and Alatornio to form the new city of Tornio in 1973 and Karunki is now a taajama.
