= Finland–Sweden border =

International border

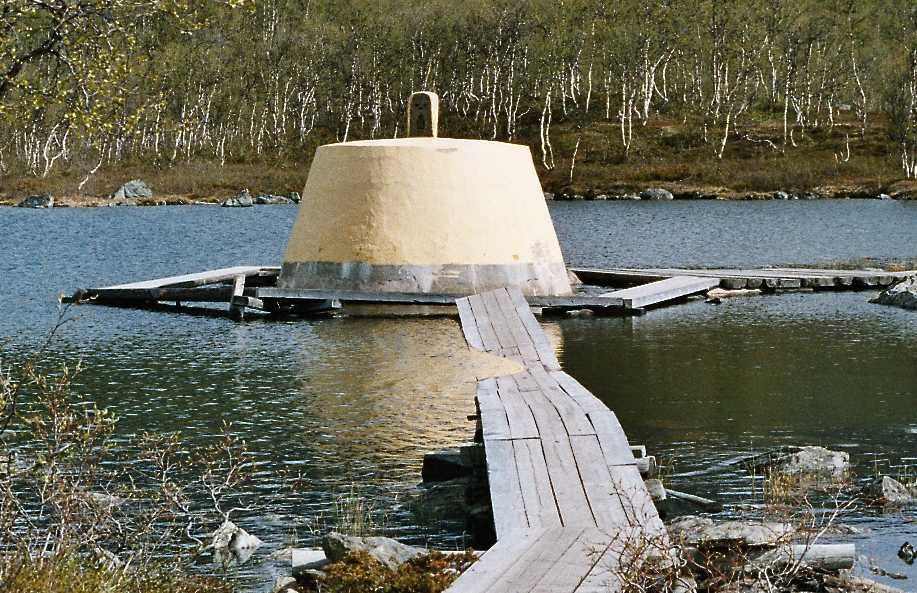
The Treriksröset tripoint in the lake Koltajärvi.

The Finland–Sweden border (or Finnish–Swedish border) is the border between the countries of Finland and Sweden. Almost the entire border runs through water: along the Tornio River and its tributaries, and in the Gulf of Bothnia. Only a few kilometres of the border are on dry land. Because of the Schengen treaty and the Nordic Passport Union, the border can be crossed mostly freely.

== Course of the border ==
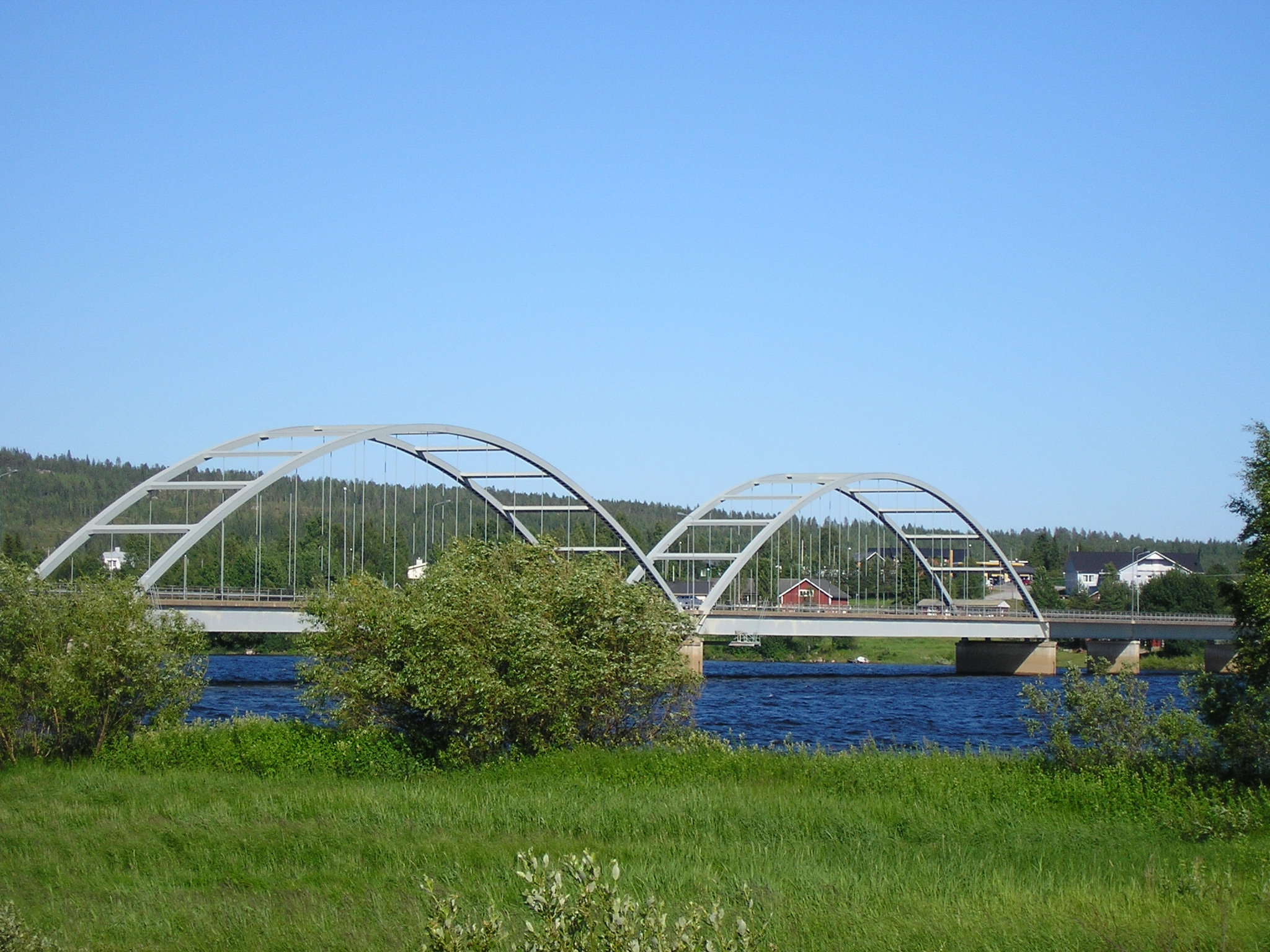
The Aavasaksa Bridge crosses the river Tornionjoki.

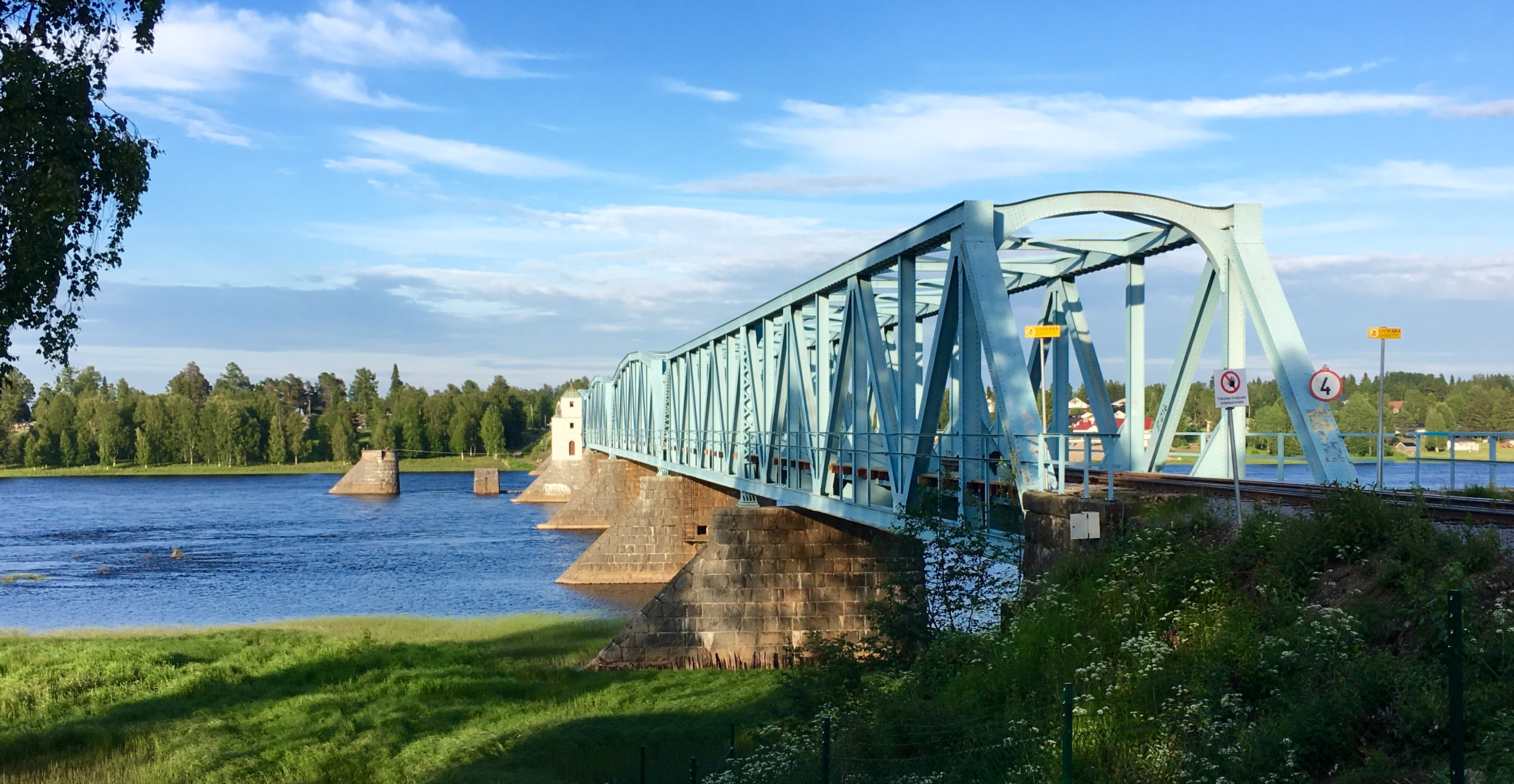
The Torne River Railway Bridge with two sets of tracks with different gauges.

The complex border through the island of Märket.

In the north, the Finnish–Swedish border begins from the Treriksröset tripoint at the border of Norway, located in the Koltajärvi lake near Kilpisjärvi, which is also the northernmost point of Sweden. The first 230 m (750 ft) of the border are in straight lines and marked with border signs. The border continues as a river border: first along a small river to Kuohkimajärvi, then along Kuohkimajoki to Kilpisjärvi, then along the rivers Könkämäeno, Muonionjoki and Tornionjoki, a total of 555.5 km (345.2 mi) down to Tornio. The river border runs along the deepest parts of the rivers (the thalweg), and is not marked with border signs; instead the border location is defined by the official maps of the border protocol. There are some border markers near Tornio where the border runs on land.

In Tornio, the border departs from the river: the centre of Tornio is located west of the river, but belongs to Finland. The border runs in straight lines for 4.03 kilometres between the cities of Tornio and Haparanda, and from there in straight lines 25.31 km as a maritime border mostly through sea, but also through islands including one called Kataja. In 1809 the border went between the islands Kataja and Inakari, but the post-glacial rebound has caused them to join into a single island. The border continues as a maritime border to a point in the Bothnian Bay, where the Finnish and Swedish territorial waters depart from each other.

In the Bothnian Bay and the Bothnian Sea, the Finnish and Swedish territorial waters are separated by international waters. In the Norra Kvarken, the distance between land is down to 22.4 kilometres (12.1 nmi), giving less than the normal 12 nautical miles (22 km) to each country. Here a narrow channel of international water goes along an agreed path. The territorial waters meet again in the Sea of Åland, where the countries have a maritime border of 15 kilometres. The border crosses the island of Märket, which has a 470-metre long, complexly shaped border marked with border signs.

The international waters between the countries are divided into economic zones. The border between the economic zones mainly runs in straight lines through defined coordinate points. There have been agreements about the borders in 1972 and in 1994. The zone border continues south into the northern Baltic Sea to a point where it meets the zone border of Estonia. The tripoint between the economic zones is defined by a treaty signed in 2001.

== History ==
The Finnish–Swedish border was created in 1809 by the Treaty of Fredrikshamn, as Sweden ceded Finland over to the Russian Empire. The course of the border was described in the fifth article of the treaty, without great detail. The borders were agreed to be the Sea of Åland, the Gulf of Bothnia, and the rivers Tornionjoki and Muonionjoki. Islands in the sea belonged to whichever country was the nearest to them. At the mouth of the Torniojoki river, the Pirkkiö island, the harbour of Röyttä and the city of Tornio were agreed to belong to Russia. Along the rivers, the border was agreed to run along the deepest part of the river (thalweg). The border ran up the Muonionjoki river and "past Kilpisjärvi to Norway".

... elle suivra le cours du fleuve Muonio en passant devant Muonioniska, Muonio Öfreby, Palojoens, Kultane, Enontekis. Kelottijerfvi, Paitiko, Nuimaka, Raunula et Kilpisjaure, jusqu'à la Norvège. Dans le cours des rivières de Torneå et de Muonio, tel qu'il vient d'être désigné, les Iles situées à l'Est du Thalweg appartiendront à la Russie, et celles à l'Ouest du Thalweg à la Suède.

The course of the border was amended in 1810 and small changes were later made. It created the so-called "sovereignty islands", which lie in one country but whose owners live in the other.

The island of Märket was decided to be split in two parts in a topographical description made in 1811. The border was decided to run through the geographical centre of the island (defined by coordinates) in the treaty of Åland in 1921 and in the treaty of continental plates in 1972. The Märket lighthouse, built in 1885 by Finland and operated by them, was left on the Swedish side. In 1981, the border on the island was modified into a curve to get the lighthouse on the Finnish side.

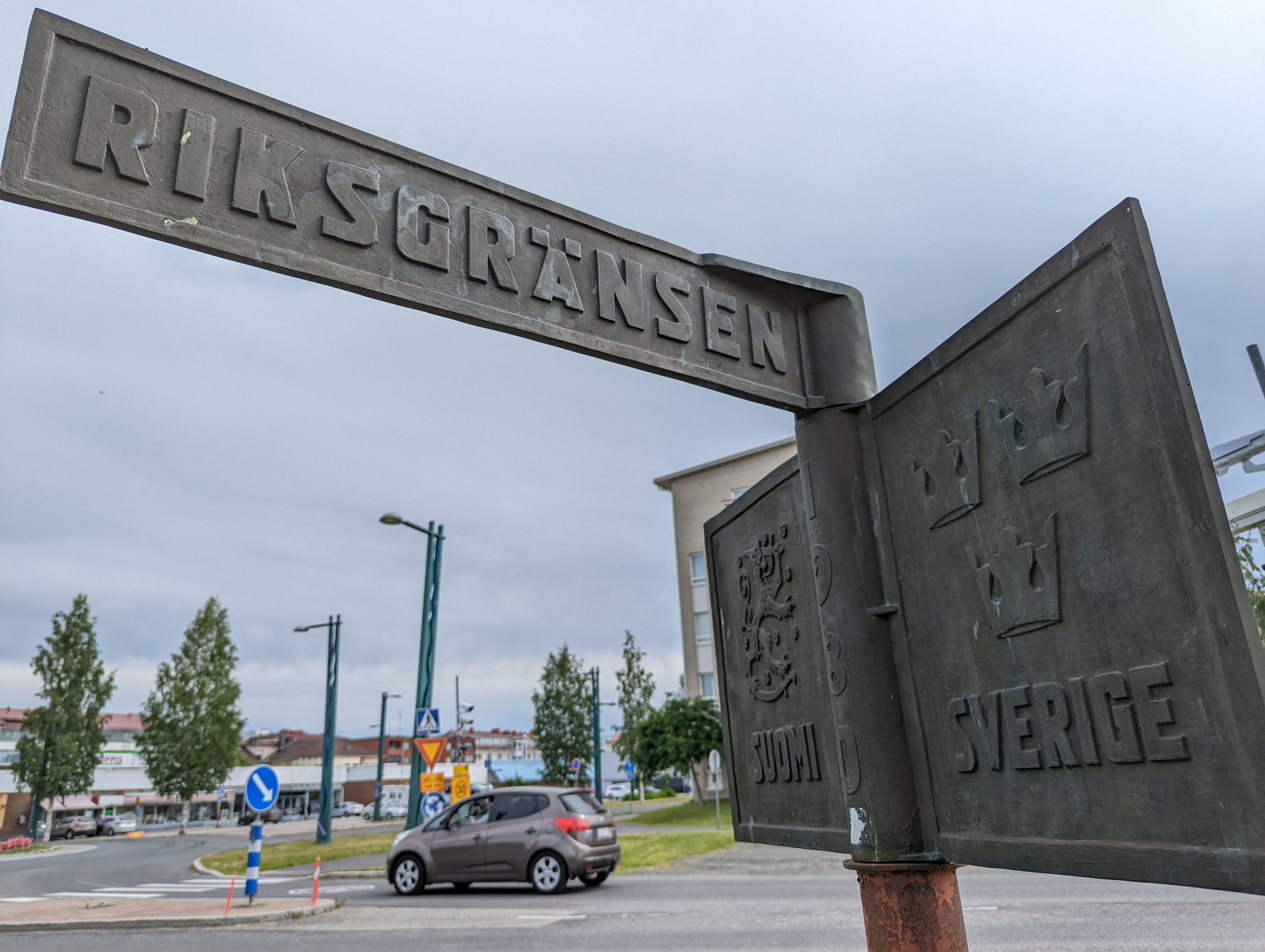
Border sign between Sweden and Finland

The border is agreed to be regularly inspected every 25 years. During the independence of Finland, inspections have been made in 1926–1927, 1956–1957, 1981 and 2006. These inspections include inspecting the course of the border, repairing the border signs if needed, and defining the location of the deepest parts of the river through aerial and terrestrial photography. Especially in the wide, sandbanked areas of the rivers, the deepest parts shift in location. If the deepest part has shifted, the border may be shifted accordingly. For example, in the 2006 inspection, the border was shifted in many places, usually by 10 to 20 metres, but in some places up to 100 metres. A similar total area was moved from one country to another in both directions.

In 1995 both countries entered the European Union, and as a result most customs stations closed. In 2020, during the COVID-19 pandemic, the border was closed to all crossings except necessary such as travelling home or important freight. A temporary fence was erected along the border right through the Haparanda-Tornio urban area.

== Traffic ==
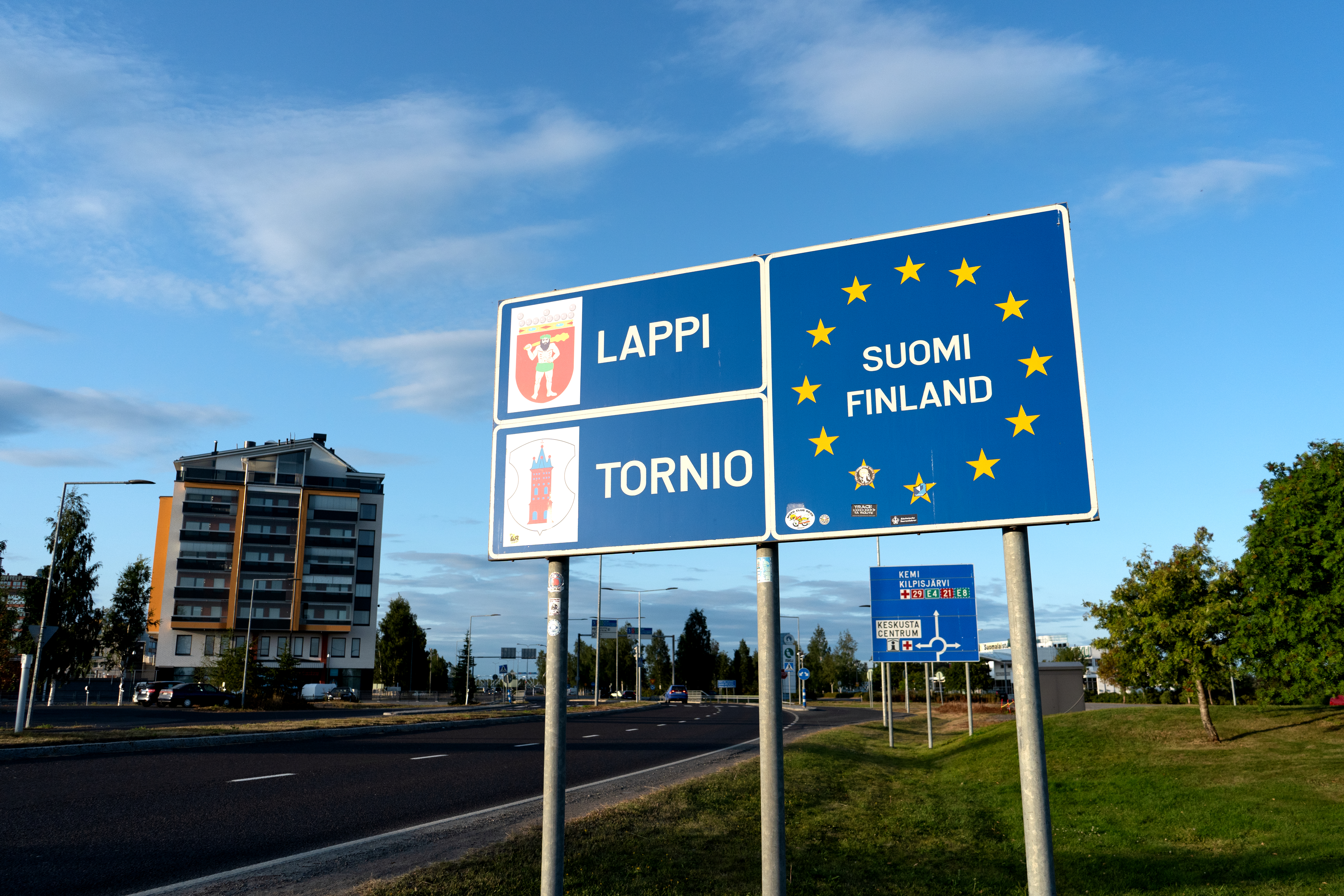
The municipal border sign of Tornio at the Finland–Sweden border.

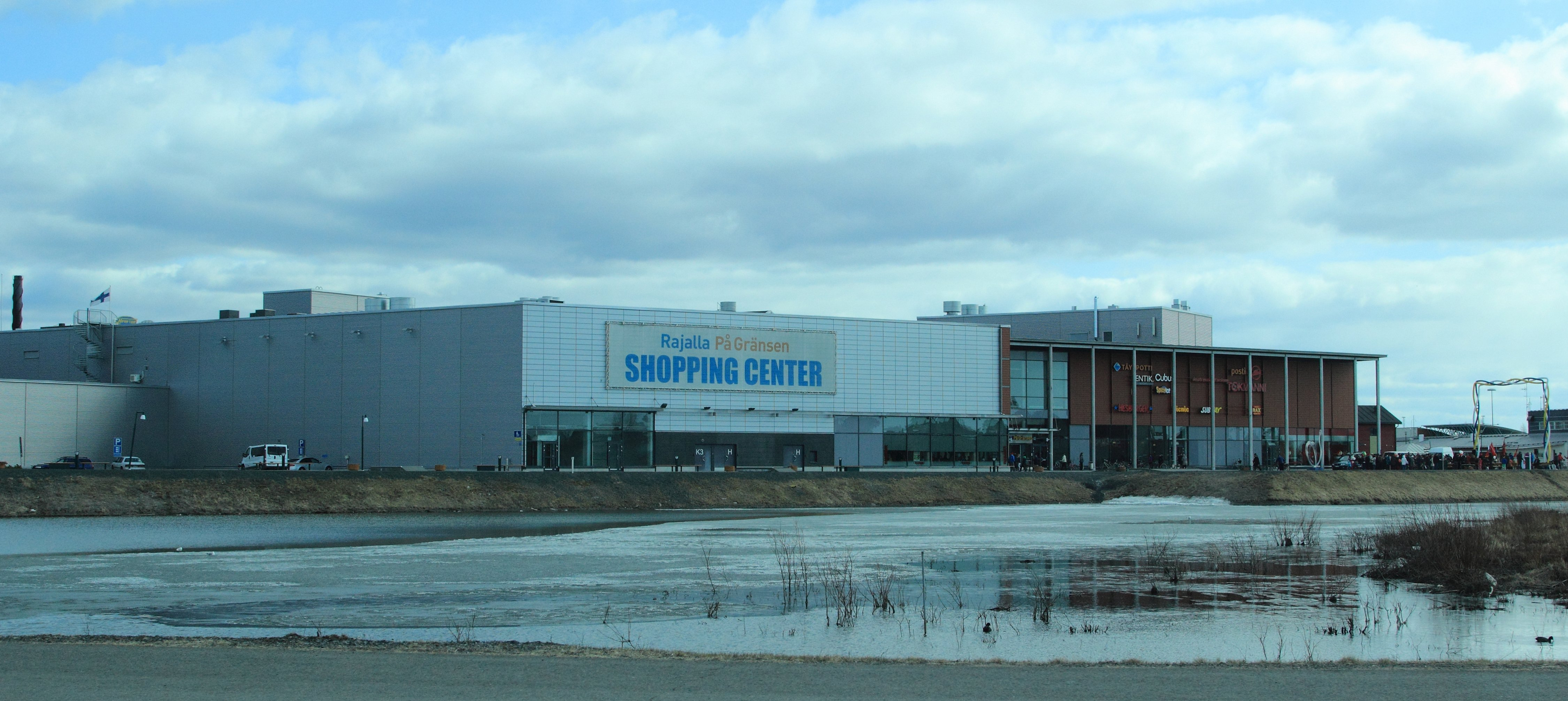
The Rajalla – På Gränsen shopping mall in Tornio

Because both Finland and Sweden are part of the Schengen area, the border may be crossed anywhere. If the traveller is carrying goods to be declared through customs, the border may still be crossed anywhere, but the traveller must contact customs to declare his/her goods.

Through the entire river border, near the eastern shore, the Finnish national road 21/European route E8 runs between Tornio and Kilpisjärvi. The Swedish national road 99 runs near the western shore along most of the border. Bridges across the river border can be found in Karesuvanto/Karesuando (road 959/E45), Muonio (road 954/404), Kolari (road 943/403), Pello (road 937/402) and in Aavasaksa/Övertorneå (road 98). There are also two river bridges in Tornio (one carries the European route E4, also Finnish national road 29), but they don't cross the border. The border is crossed by three roads in Haparanda/Tornio. South of the centre, the Torne River Railway Bridge crosses the river and the border.

In Haparanda/Tornio, there is a bus station common to both cities, which was opened in 2014 and is located on the Swedish side near the border (65°50′36″N 24°8′18″E).

== See also ==
- Finland–Sweden relations
