= Laurila =

- Village
- Location in Finland
- Coordinates: 65°48′N 24°32′E
- Country: Finland
- Province: Lapland
- Municipality: Keminmaa

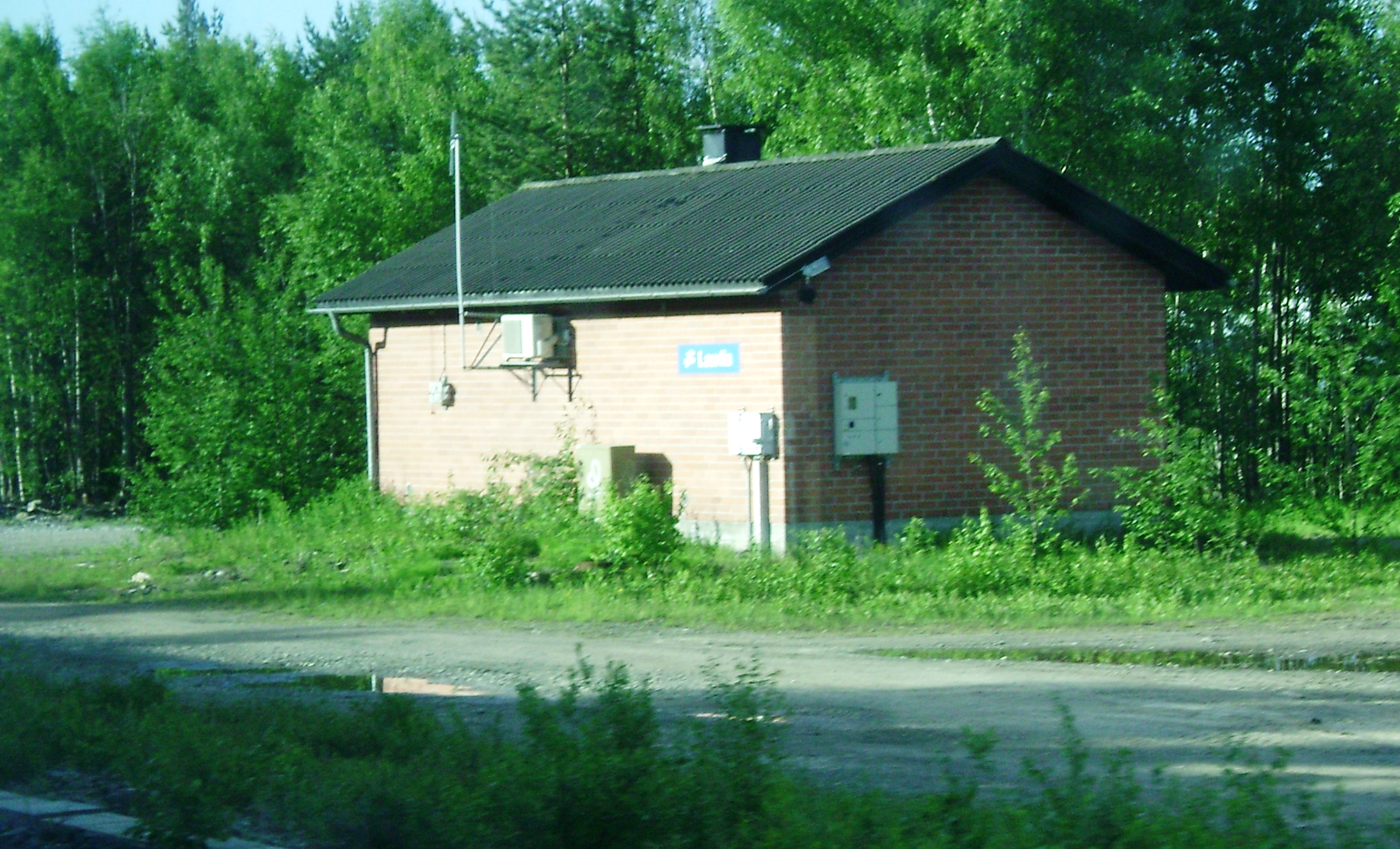
Laurila railway station

Laurila is a village in the municipality of Keminmaa in Lapland in north-western Finland.
