= VR Class Dm7 =

Class of Finnish diesel multiple unit

Dm6, Dm7
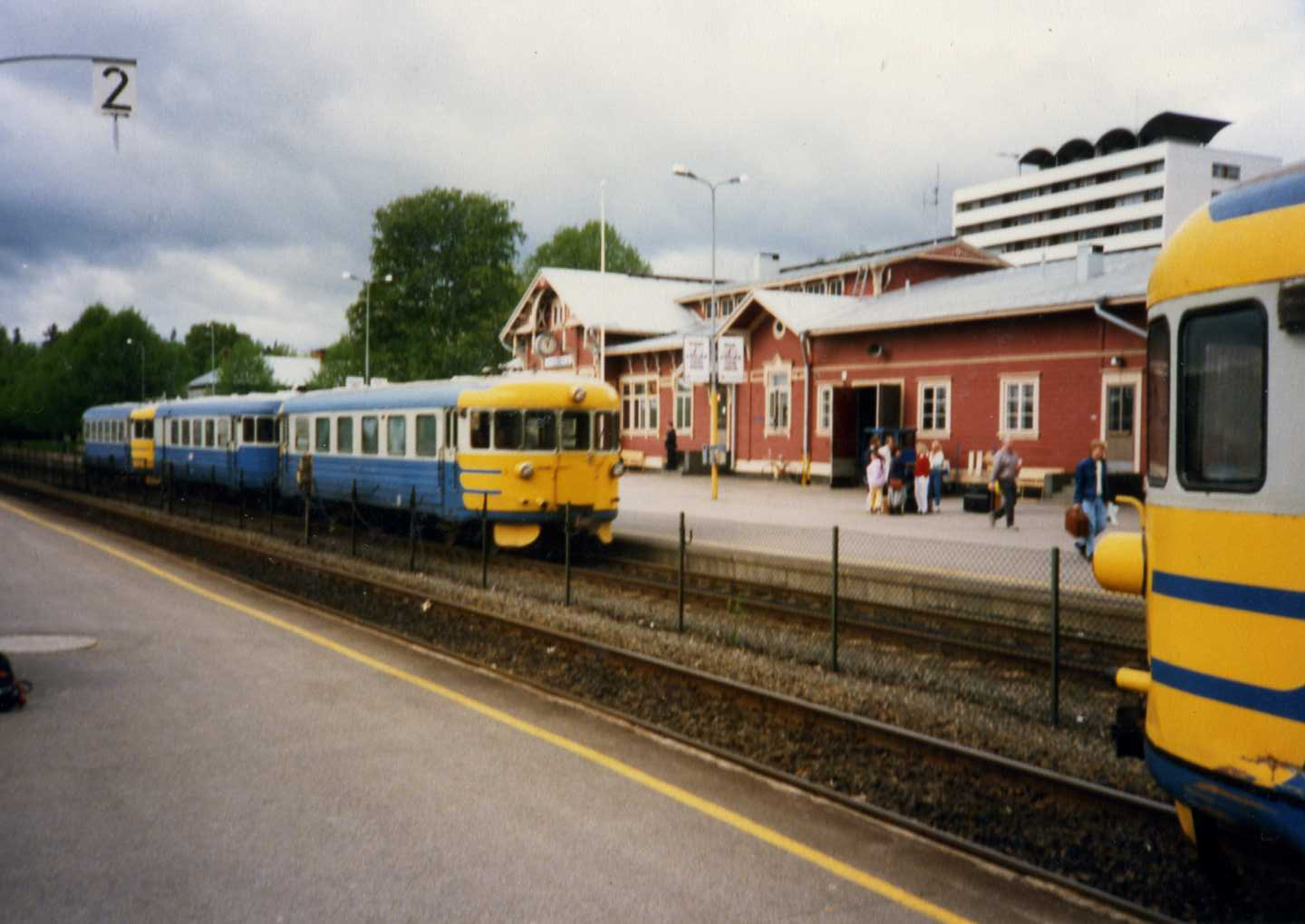
- Dm7 multiple units at Jyväskylä railway station in 1987
- In service: 1954–88
- Manufacturer: Valmet
- Constructed: 1954–63
- Number built: 15 (Dm6); 197 (Dm7)
- Number preserved: 21
- Fleet numbers: 4000–4014 (Dm6); 4020–4216 (Dm7)
- Capacity: 64 passengers
- Operator: Valtionrautatiet

Specifications
- Car length: 16,660 mm (54 ft 7 7/8 in)
- Width: 3,100 mm (10 ft 2 in)
- Height: 3,400 mm (11 ft 1 7/8 in)
- Maximum speed: 95 km/h (59 mph), later 115 km/h (71 mph)
- Weight: 15–18 t (14.8–17.7 long tons; 16.5–19.8 short tons)
- Prime mover: Valmet 815 D
- Power output: 130 kW (170 hp)
- UIC classification: (1A)′(A1)′dm
- AAR wheel arrangement: 1A-A1
- Track gauge: 1,524 mm (5 ft)

The Dm6 and Dm7 were diesel multiple units built by Valmet in the 1950s and 1960s for Valtionrautatiet. They are known by their nickname lättähattu (Finnish for "flat hat", the first widespread youth culture movement in Finland).

== History ==
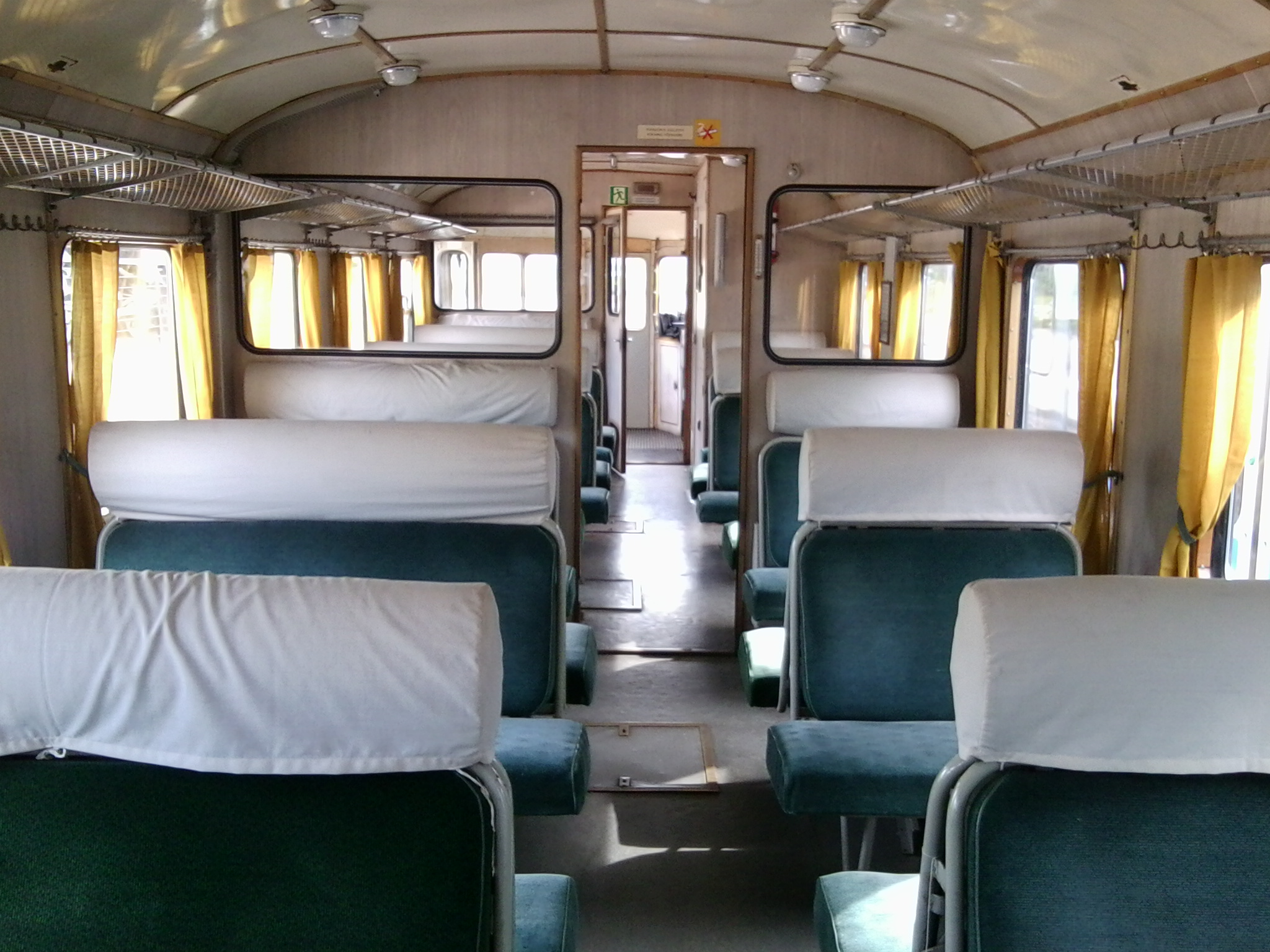
Dm7 at the inside

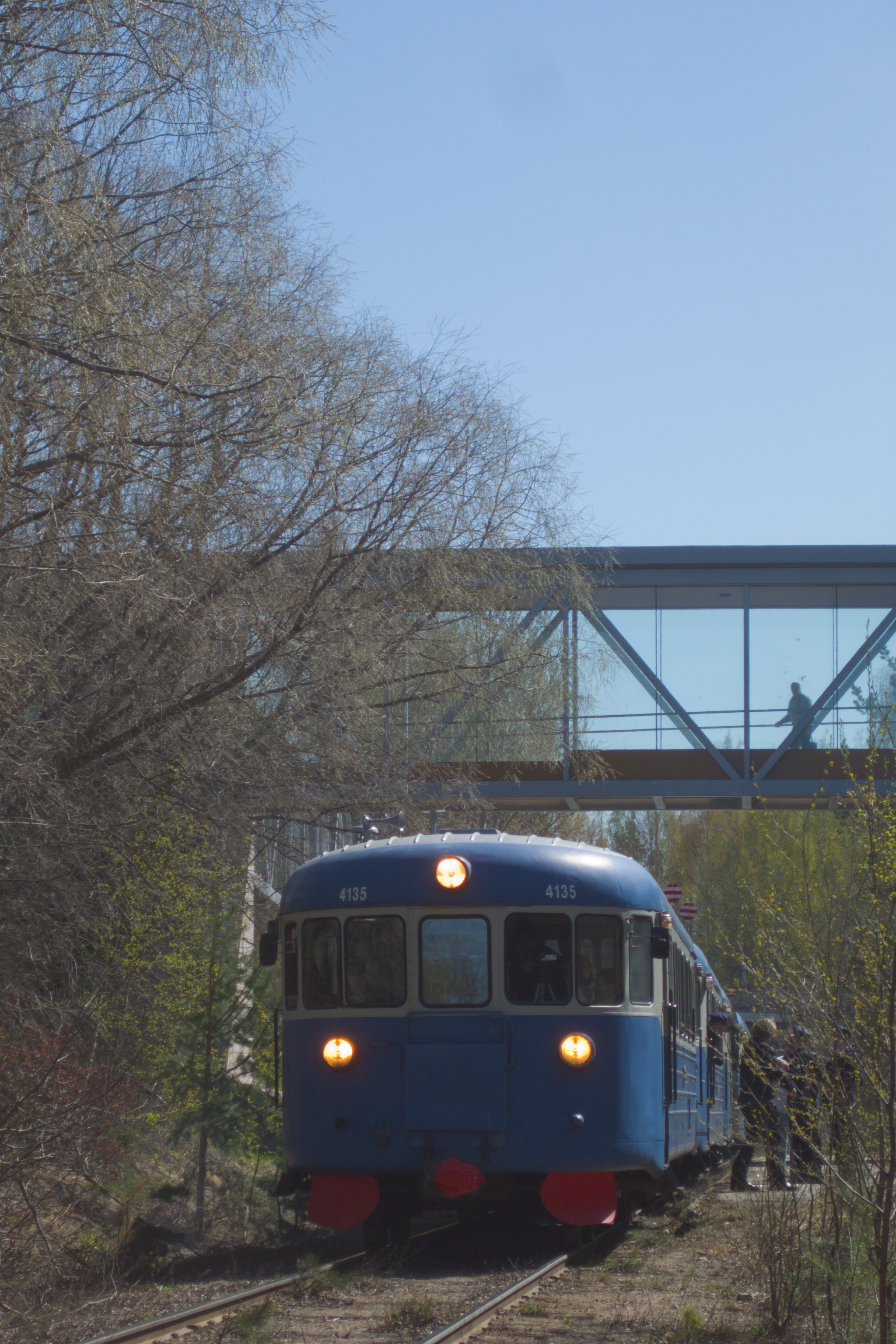
A preserved Dm7 at Äänekoski station in 2011.

At the beginning of the 1950s it became clear that VR needed multiple units to compete with buses in short-distance traffic. In 1952, seven Dm6s were ordered from Valmet, and eight more the next year.

After testing the Dm6:s and having noted that the new DMU:s worked well in Finnish conditions, VR ordered more units. In total, 197 Dm7 class multiple units were built with some modifications (a larger wheel size, for instance).

== Variants ==
VR Class Dm7 recorded on 28 June 2018

=== DmG7 ===
Three Dm7:s (numbers 4145–4147) were transformed into goods transport vehicles. They were withdrawn in 1981.

=== Ttv ===
16 Dm7:s were transformed into electric maintenance vehicles.

== Preservation ==
All Dm6:s have been withdrawn from service. 20 Dm7:s are preserved by Finnish museum railway associations.

No:4020 is at the Finnish Railway Museum.

== See also ==
- Finnish Railway Museum
- VR Group
- List of Finnish locomotives
- List of railway museums Worldwide
- Heritage railways
- List of heritage railways
- Restored trains
- Jokioinen Museum Railway
- History of rail transport in Finland
