= Port of Tornio =

Port in Tornio, Finland

- Click on the map for a fullscreen view
- Port of Tornio (Finland)
- Native name: Tornion satama – Torneå hamn

Location
- Country: Finland
- Location: Tornio
- Coordinates: 65.753°N 24.157°E
- UN/LOCODE: FI ROY

Details
- Operated by: Outokumpu Shipping
- Type of harbour: coastal breakwater
- Draft depth: max. 9.0 metres (29.5 ft) depth

Statistics
- Annual cargo tonnage: c. 3.0 m tons (int'l) (2018)

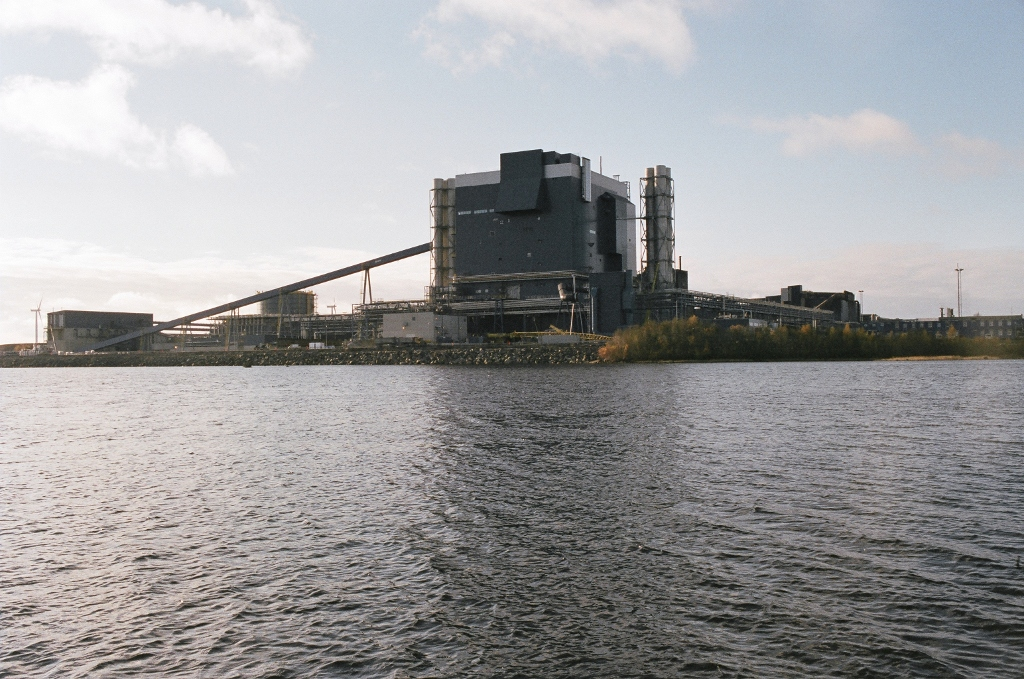

The Port of Tornio (Finnish: Tornion satama, Swedish: Torneå hamn), also known as the Port of Röyttä, is a cargo port located in the city of Tornio, Finland, at the end of the Bothnian Bay and close to Finland's border with Sweden. It is near the Port of Kemi, with which it shares part of the shipping lane.

The port is operated by Outokumpu Shipping, and its main user is the adjacent Outokumpu steelworks.

The annual international cargo throughput of the Port of Tornio was c. 3.0 million tons in 2018, fairly evenly split between exports and imports, making it the tenth biggest port in Finland by tonnage.

The port has a maximum depth of 9.0 metres (29.5 ft).
