= Karungi =

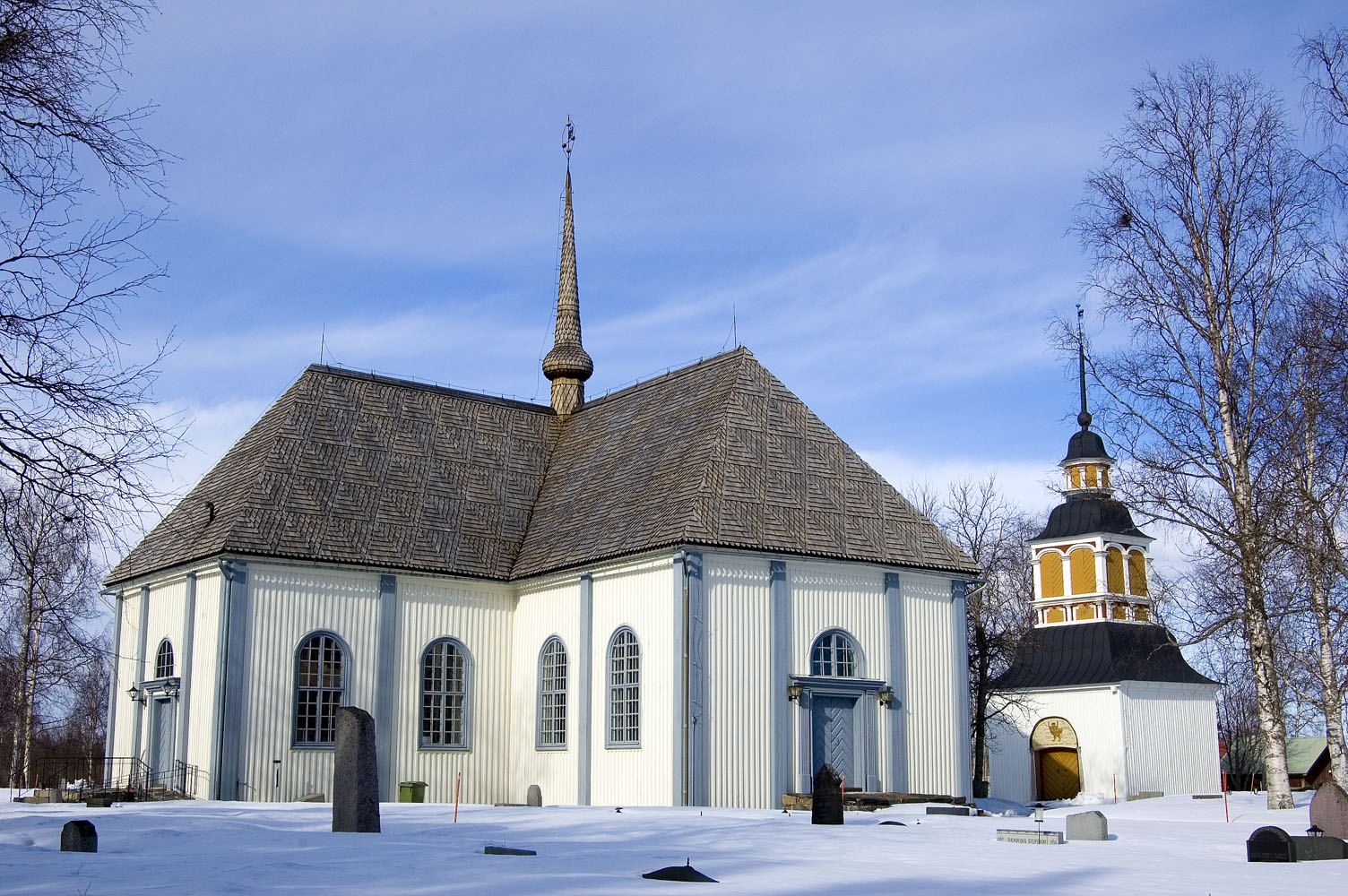
- The Karl Gustav church in Karungi

- Location within Norrbotten Location within Sweden
- Coordinates: 66°03′N 23°57′E
- Country: Sweden
- Province: Norrbotten
- County: Norrbotten County
- Municipality: Haparanda Municipality

Area
  - Total: 1.23 km^{2} (0.47 sq mi)

Population (31 December 2010)
  - Total: 232
  - Density: 188/km^{2} (490/sq mi)
- Time zone: UTC+1 (CET)
  - Summer (DST): UTC+2 (CEST)

Karungi (Swedish pronunciation: [ˈkǎrːɵŋɡɪ], Finnish and Meänkieli: Karunki) is a locality situated in Haparanda Municipality, Norrbotten County, Sweden with 232 inhabitants in 2010. The language most spoken in the village is Meänkieli, which the first of April 2000 officially was declared as a minority language in Sweden.

Karungi is located at the Torne river where the border to Finland goes. On the Finnish side of the river, opposite to Karungi, the village Karunki (pop 483) is located. There is no bridge, but crossing the river is done by boat or on the ice. These two villages have a common history since before the national border was drawn in the river, through the village, in 1809.

== Notable people ==
- Sven-Erik Bucht, Minister for Rural Affairs, 2014-2019
