= Torne (Finnish and Swedish river) =

River in northern Sweden and Finland

Torne river Tornionjoki (Finnish) Torne älv/Torneälven (Swedish) Duortneseatnu (Northern Sami) Tornionväylä (Meänkieli)
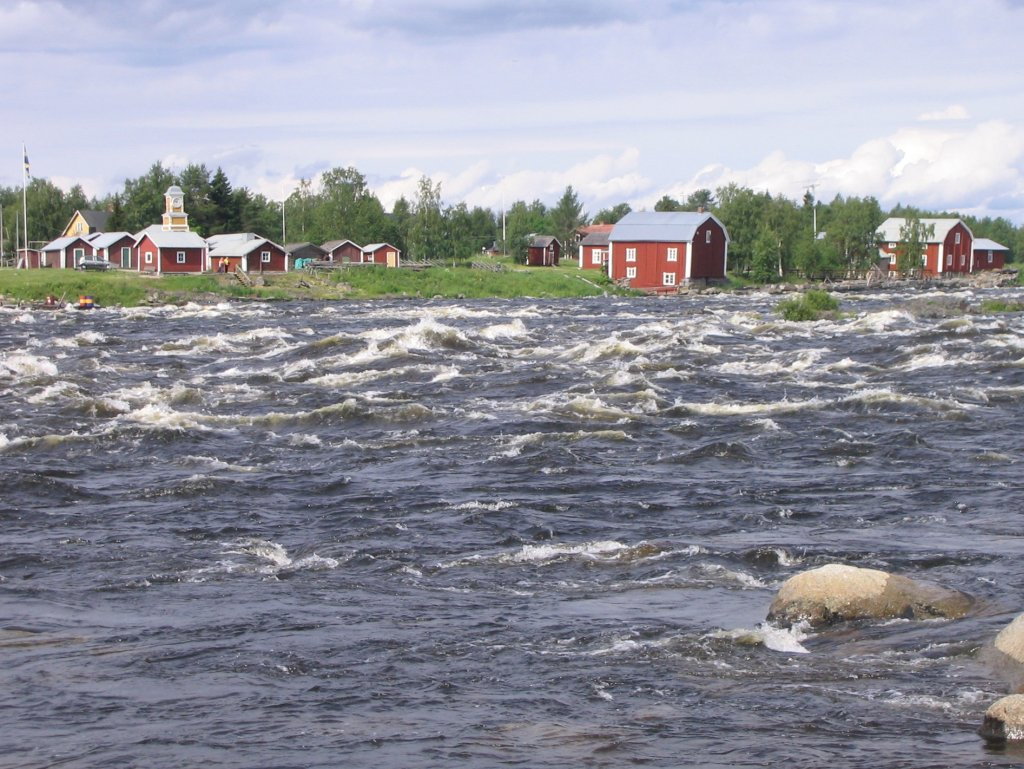
- The Torne at Kukkola rapids north of Tornio

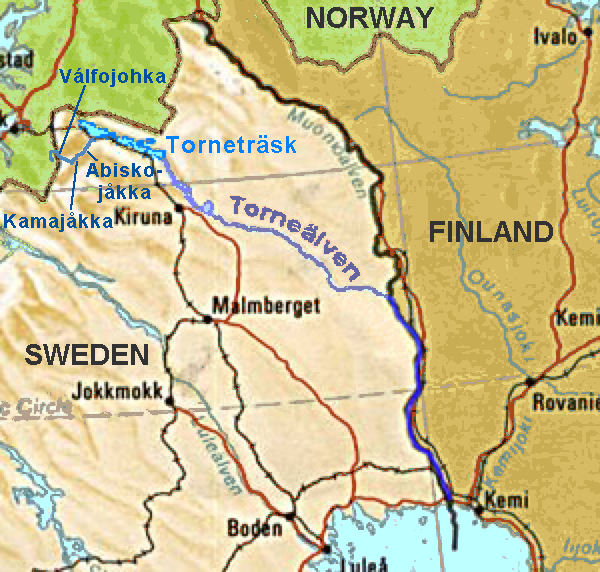
- Location of the Torne

Location
- Countries: Sweden; Finland; Norway (hydrological source)

Physical characteristics
- Source: Torne träsk and its main affluent
  - location: Kiruna Municipality, Norrbotten, Sweden
  - coordinates: 68°22′N 019°06′E
  - elevation: 341 m (1,119 ft)(hydrological source 1189 m 65°48′30″N 24°8′45″E)
- Mouth: Gulf of Bothnia
  - location: Tornio/Haparanda, Finland/Sweden
  - coordinates: 65°50′N 024°09′E
  - elevation: 0 m (0 ft)
- Length: 510 km (320 mi) plus 110 km above the outlet of Torneträsk
- Basin size: 40,157.1 km^{2} (15,504.7 sq mi)
- Discharge
  - average: 370 m^{3}/s (13,000 cu ft/s)

The Torne, also known as the Tornio (Finnish: Tornionjoki, Swedish: Torne älv, Torneälven, Northern Sami: Duortneseatnu, Meänkieli: Väylä), is a river in northern Sweden and Finland. For approximately half of its length, it defines the border between these two countries. In the upper parts, the river is situated in Sweden before it meets the Muonio River where it adjoins the Finland–Sweden border. It rises at the lake Torneträsk near the border with Norway and flows generally southeast for a distance of 522 kilometres (324 mi) into the Gulf of Bothnia. It is the largest river in Norrbotten County both by length and by watershed area.

At its source, the Torne is located close to the North Atlantic and Narvik on the other side of the watershed, with several thousands of kilometres between the locations via waterways.

== Geography ==
The Torne basin has a total area of 37,300 square kilometres (14,400 sq mi) or 40,147.1 square kilometres (15,500.9 sq mi) (see sidebar). Of this, 25,392.2 km^{2} (9,804.0 sq mi) or 25,393.1 km^{2} (9,804.3 sq mi) is in Sweden, 10,400 km^{2} (4,000 sq mi) or 14,266.3 km^{2} (5,508.2 sq mi) is in Finland and 1,500 km^{2} (580 sq mi) or 497.7 km^{2} (192.2 sq mi) is in Norway.

=== Nominal source and hydrological source ===
The source of the Torne is generally believed to be the lake Torneträsk near the border with Norway. But the main feeder of this lake is Abiskojåkka, flowing out of Abiskojaure, which is mainly fed by Kamajåkka, coming from tributary Gamajávri. This lake's major tributary is Válfojohka. That river comes from Lake Válfojávri in Norway's Nordland, but near to that lake it is joined by a nameless, longer stream, according to official Swedish maps fed by a small glacier, 1,189 m (3,901 ft) above sea level (68°16′02″N 18°07′41″E).

=== Lake Torne ===
Other affluents of Lake Torne are Njuoraätno and Kåppasjåkka in the west, Gurttejohka, Snurrijåkka, Bessešjohka, Bággesgorsajohka, Davip Duoptejohka, Lulip Duoptejohka, Sarvájohka and others in the north, and Rákkasjohka, Gohpasjohka, Miellejohka, Bessešjohka, Golkkokjohka, Nivsakkjohka and others in the south. Above Torne lake, the watershed of the Torne includes the villages Riksgränsen, Katterjåkk, Vassijaure, Låktatjåkka, Kopperåsen and Tornehamn. On the south shore of Torne lake are Björkliden, Abisko, Stordalen, Kaisepakte. Stenbacken and Torneträsk. On the north shore are the Sami villages Laimoluokta and Kattuvuoma.

=== Upper river ===
Beyond the lake, the Torne River flows unhindered by any concentrations of human inhabitants until the village of Kurravaara, around 12 kilometres (7 mi) northeast of Kiruna. The river splits in two parts that only join at Kurravaara; the part between the river is Alajávri nature reserve. Between the lake and Kurravaara, the streams Čearrojogaš and Rávdojohka join on the right side, and shortly before Kurravaara, the 135-kilometre (84 mi) long Rautas River flows into the Torne. On the left side, the streams Gukkajohka, Reaskkajohka and Dápmokjohka join. In the area between the two streams, the Beallejohka joins the right arm from the left.

After Kurravaara, the river proceeds Laxforsen, where it is joined from the right by the Luossajoki. Here is the first bridge over the river for the road leading from the E10 to Laxforsen, Luossajärvi and Esrange. The river continues to Jukkasjärvi, where an ice hotel is built in winter from the river ice.

==== To the Bifurcation ====
Beyond Paksuniemi, the river is joined by the Pounujoki from the right. At Vittangi, the 126-kilometre (78 mi) long Vittangi river, which passes by Esrange, joins from the left. Here is the second river-crossing bridge, used by the E45 to Karesuando. The river then proceeds to Kuoksu, where it is crossed by the road to Lainio and Oksajärvi, and to Juopakosku, where the Junojoki joins from the left. At Junosuando, the Torne river loses 56% of its water to the Tärendö River in one of the four bifurcations in the watershed area. Here is also a bridge for the road to Kangos and Parkolombolo; this is the fourth bridge over the river.

Shortly after Junosuando, the Piipionjoki joins from the left and at Palokorva, the 260-kilometre (160 mi) long Lainio River joins from the left. In the Lainio River watershed are two more, smaller bifurcations: the lakes Goldajávri, Råstojaure flow toward contributaries of the Laino river as well as to the Norwegian streams Signaldalselva and Råstaelva respectively.

==== Down to Pajala ====
Between Junosuando and Pajala, the Käymäjoki joins from the left and the Liviöjoki and the Mertajoki join from the right. The village Anttis is located on the left bank of the river, with Swedish road Riksväg 395 on the right bank; the fifth bridge connects Anttis to the main road. Shortly after Pajala, the Torne river joins with the 380-kilometre (240 mi) long Muonio River, the biggest contributary of the Torne river. Near Pajala are two more bridges going north. North of this point, the Muonio river forms the border with Finland. From this point, the border with Finland is formed by the Torne river.

=== Lower river ===
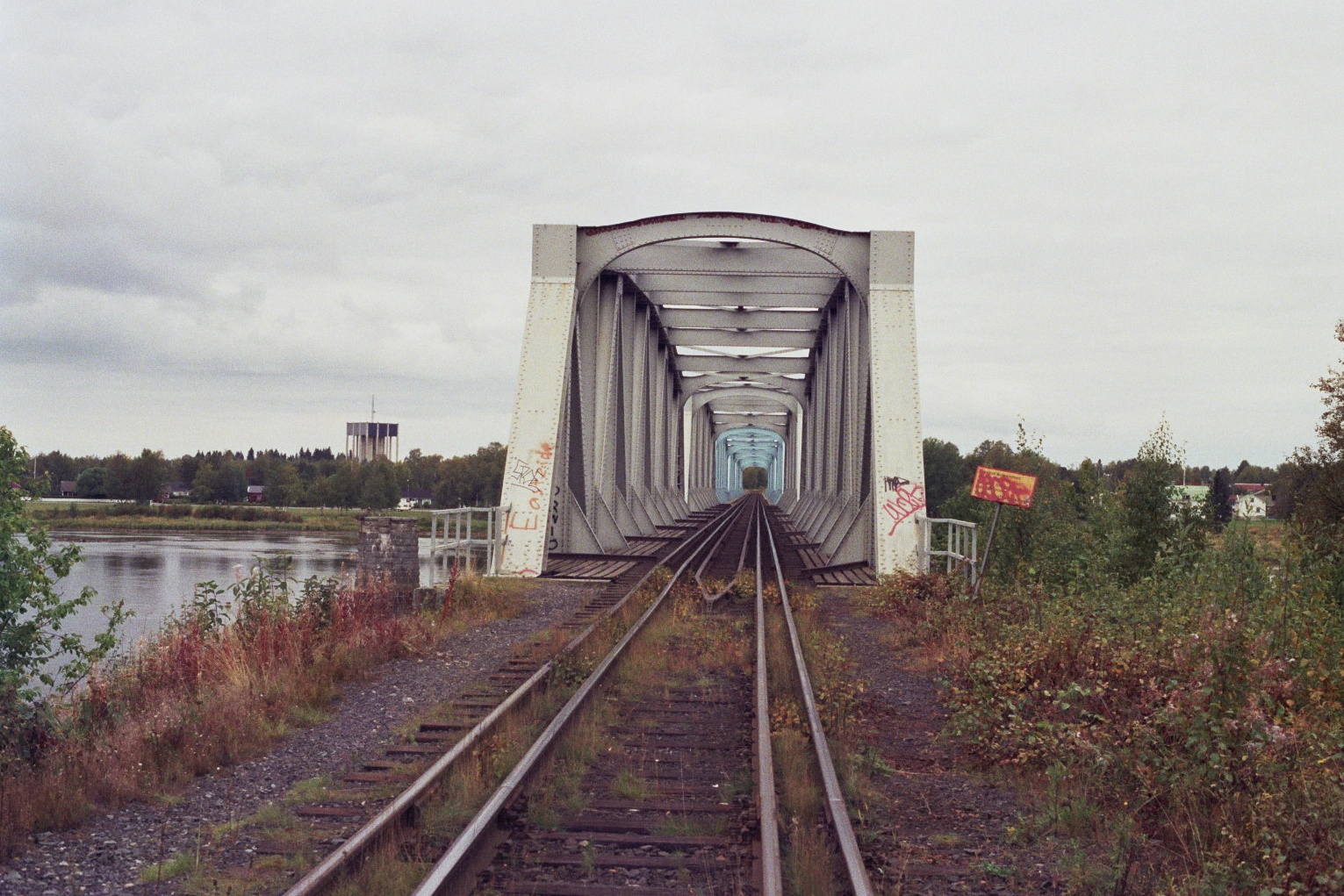
The Torne River Railway Bridge, a dual gauge railway bridge, with a four rail gauntlet track, the only fixed railway connection between Sweden and Finland.

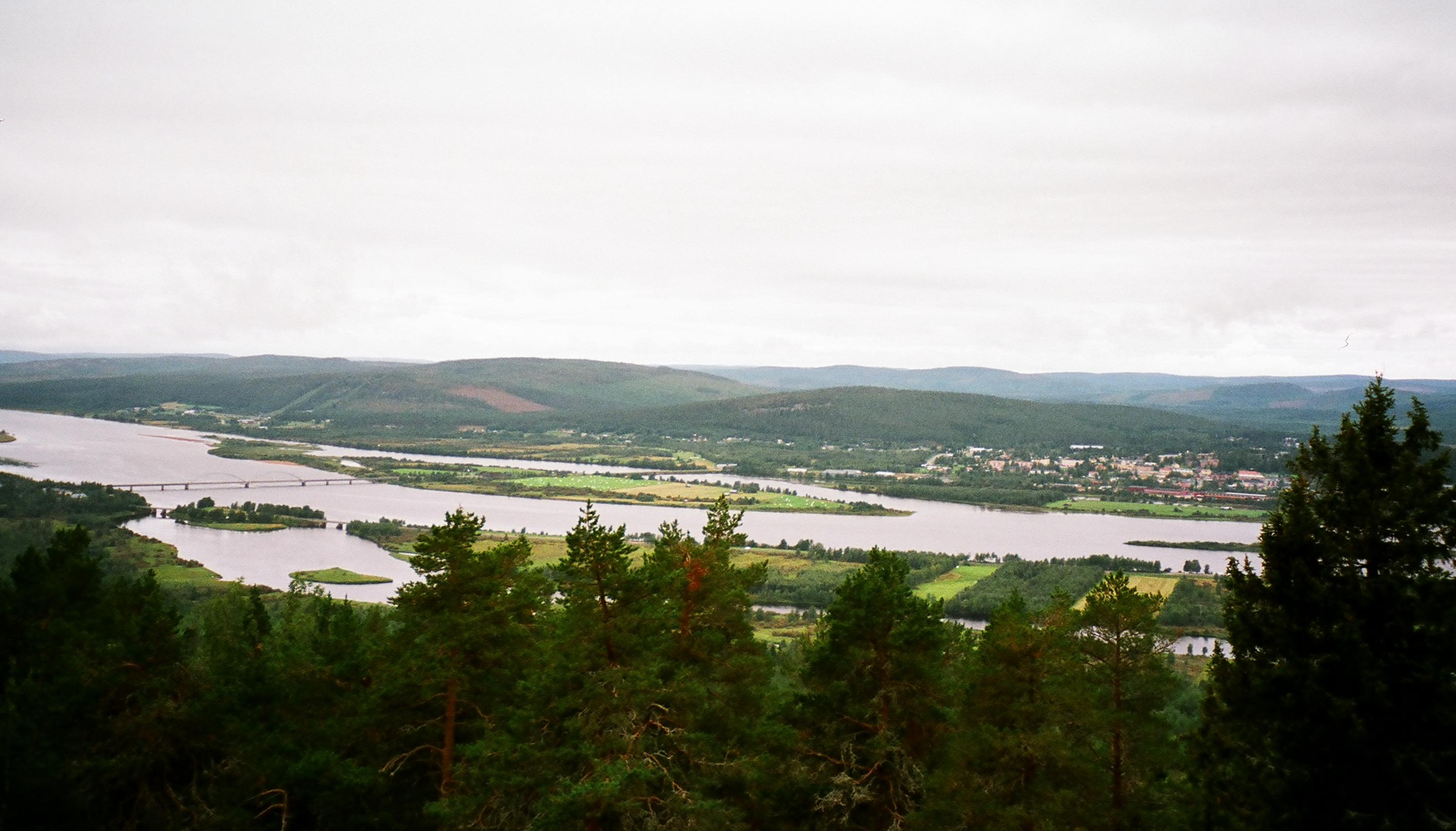
Torne river near Övertorneå as seen from the Finnish side. The bridge can be seen to the left.

From here the river flows south along the Finno-Swedish border. Slightly south of Pajala is a border-crossing bridge for a road leading to Kolari, the eighth bridge over the main river from the source. The river proceeds to the village Kassa. At the village of Pello, which lies on both sides of the river, is a bridge between the two parts. The river continues south to Svanstein, crosses the arctic circle at Juoksengi and proceeds to Niskanpää and Kuivakangas. In Övertorneå (Finnish: Ylitornio) there is another bridge, the final road bridge before the sea. Here, the 127-kilometre (79 mi) long Tengeliön River joins from the (Finnish) left side . The river continues to Hedenäset and Risudden.

At Karungi, the Liakanjoki departs from the Torne river and flows to the Gulf of Bothnia independently in Finland. From Karungi south, there are railways on both sides of the valley. At Kukkola is Kukkolaforsen, a rapids which is also a tourist attraction. Before finally arriving at the twin city of Haparanda/Tornio, it passes by the villages Vojakkala and Mattila.

In the twin city of Haparanda/Tornio are four more bridges: one for cyclists and pedestrians, one for local traffic, one for the E4 and the southernmost, last and 14th bridge over the Tornio river is a dual gauge railway bridge connecting the Swedish and Finnish railway systems.

== History ==
Antti Keksi authored a poem about the 1677 river flood.

In the Treaty of Fredrikshamn in 1809, when Sweden lost the areas which constitute present-day Finland to Imperial Russia, the river was together with the Muonio River and Könkämä River chosen as border between Sweden and the new Russian Grand Duchy of Finland, thus splitting the provinces of Lappland and Västerbotten.

According to the treaty, the border shall follow the deepest part of the river. Near Haparanda/Tornio the border was fixed in the treaty, partly on land, so the city of Tornio would belong to Russia. Once every 25 years, a commission of Swedish and Finnish representatives shall review this border. This means that the border can move, such as in 2006 when such a border change was undertaken.

== Natural history ==
Research on ice breakup on the river and on Lake Suwa in Japan suggested "global processes including climate change and variability are driving the long-term changes in ice seasonality."

== Culture ==
The Torne river is vital to the history and culture of the Tornedalian people and features frequently and consistently in Tornedalian literature and cinema and is vital to traditional livelihoods. The Tornedalian name for the river Väylä also means path, artery or way. Tornedalians have inhabited the area since perhaps the 800s. From the later 1800s up until the 1950s the Swedish state attempted to forcefully assimilate Tornedalians and swedify Torne Valley.

== See also ==
- Geography of Finland
- Geography of Sweden
- Torne, Finland
- Torne Valley
