= Riksgränsen Station =

Railway station in Kiruna, Sweden

Riksgränsen
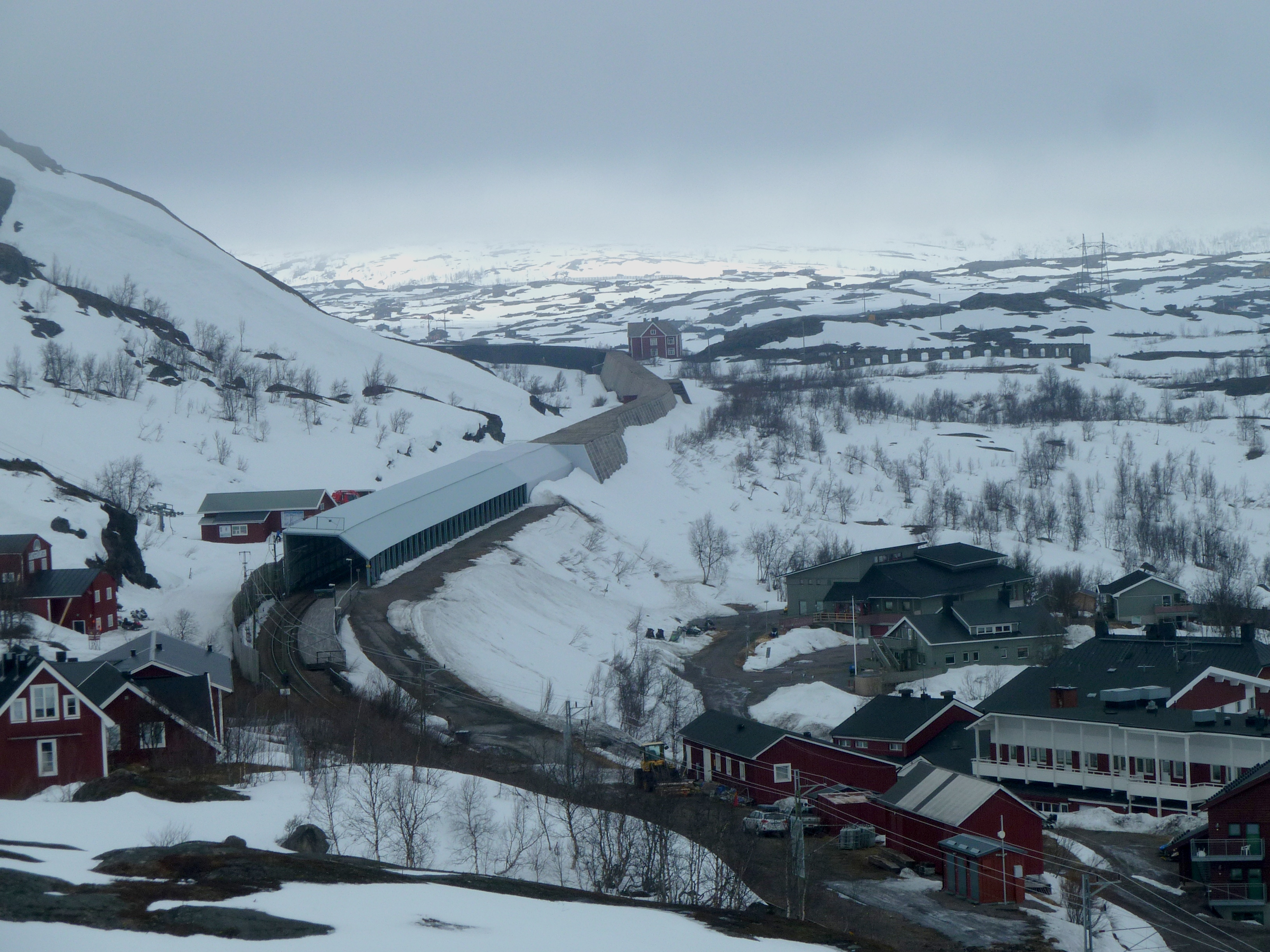

General information
- Location: Riksgränsen, Kiruna; Sweden
- Coordinates: 68.42583°N 18.12726°E
- Elevation: 521 metres (1,709 ft)
- Owner: Trafikverket
- Operator: Trafikverket
- Lines: Ofoten Line; Iron Ore Line
- Distance: 42.99 km (Narvik); 1542.7 km (Stockholm C)
- Platforms: 1
- Tracks: 1

Other information
- Station code: Rgn; BJF

History
- Opened: 1902
Location

Riksgränsen Station (Norwegian: Riksgrensen stasjon, Swedish: Riksgränsen station) is a railway station located at Riksgränsen near the Norway–Sweden border, 700 meters (2,300 ft) into Sweden. The station opened in 1902 as part of the Ofoten Line and Iron Ore Line, and was the location of the switching between Norwegian and Swedish operations.

The station's official inauguration took place on July 14, 1903, by King Oscar II, Crown Prince Gustaf, Prince Carl and Princess Ingeborg.

Originally it had a train shed and a locomotive depot and several tracks, but they have later been removed, partly in connection with electrification around 1920. Now (as of 2021) the station is only a train stop with platform and single track, not a technical railway station. It is for signalling purposes considered part of the Norwegian Bjørnfjell Station (2 km away) and there is a Norwegian signal at Riksgränsen station. A part of the platform is under roof inside a snow shelter.

The name means "National border". When the railway was planned, there were no settlement or buildings here or at most other station locations. Stations were often named after nature features such as rivers or lakes, usually in Sami language, for example the neighbour station Katterjåkk. This station got named Riksgränsen because of the border, which also is the border between the national train operator responsibilities. For many years, drivers were switched here due to different license needed in the respective country. At first, when steam locomotives were used, they were switched also.

Preceding station	Express trains	Following station
Bjørnfjell towards Narvik	F8	Katterjåkk towards Luleå C or Stockholm C
