= Norwegian County Road 7570 =

Road in Narvik Municipality, Norway

Fylkesvei 7570
- Bokmål: Fylkesvei 7570; Nynorsk: Fylkesveg 7570
- Beisfjordveien
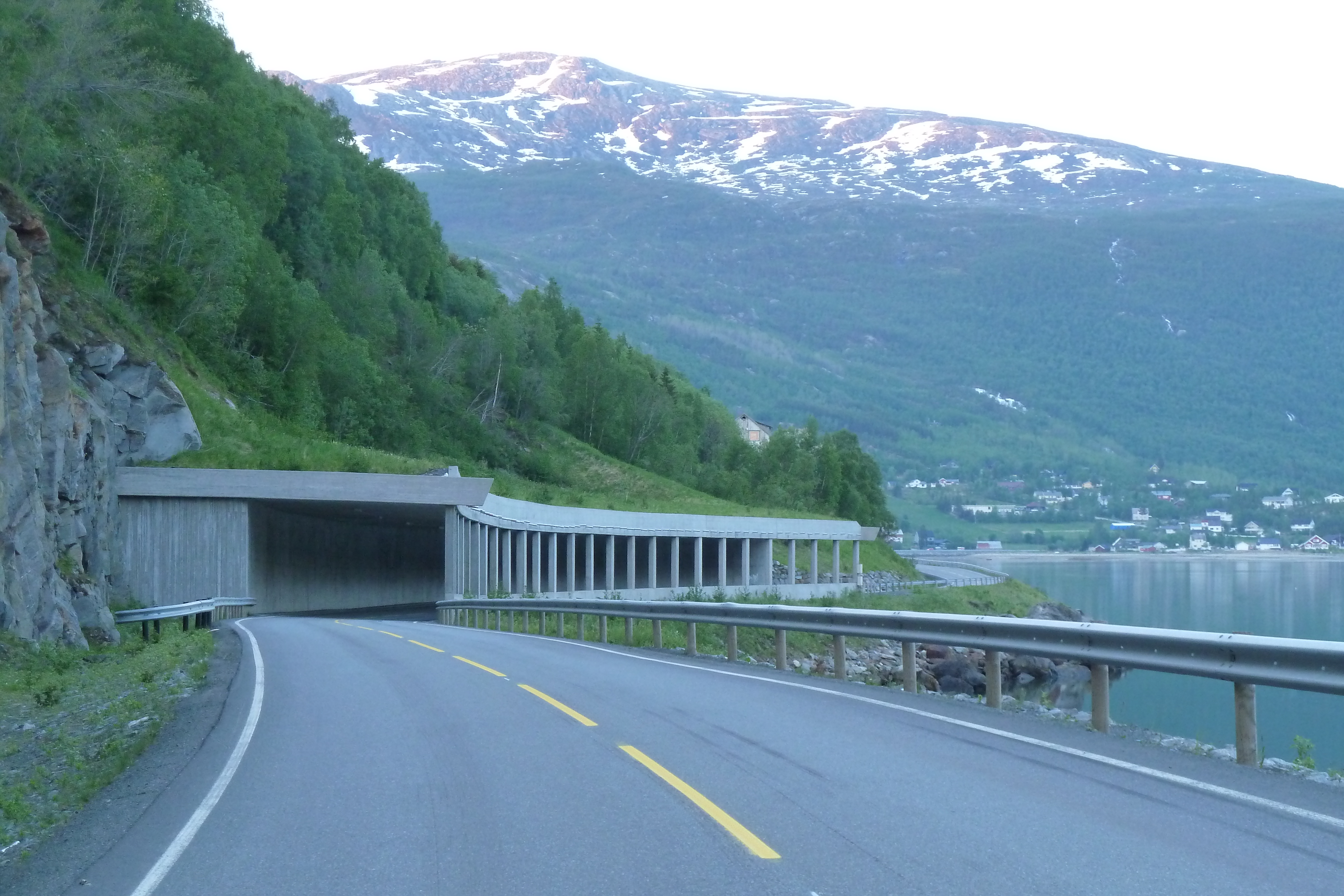
- Rockfall shelter over the road, part of Beisfjord is seen in the background.

Location
- Country: Norway

Highway system
- Roads in Norway; National Roads; County Roads

Norwegian County Road 7570 is a Norwegian county road in Narvik Municipality, Norway. The road goes along the Beis Fjord and is the only connection between Beisfjord and Narvik. The road was opened for traffic in 1928.

== Avalanche Problems ==
The road, due to its location, has had major problems with avalanches hitting it. On 22 January 2022 the road was hit by a large avalanche, covering 300 metres of the road. Following this, the Norwegian Public Roads Administration laid plans to place avalanche towers, but the work was postponed after complaints from the Norwegian Reindeer Industry. The municipality spent a total of 35 million Norwegian kroner on securing the road.
