= Søsterbekk Station =

Railway station in Narvik Municipality, Norway

Søsterbekk
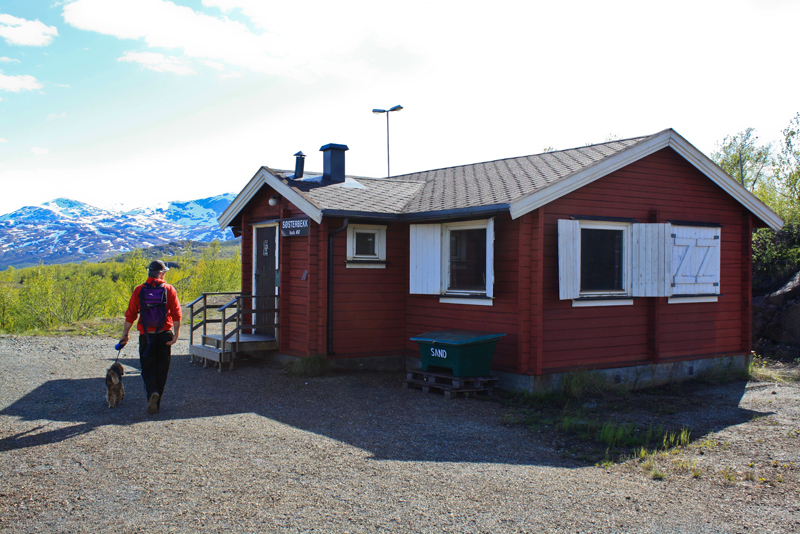

General information
- Location: Narvik, Nordland; Norway
- Coordinates: 68.4352°N 18.0033°E
- Elevation: 457 metres (1,499 ft) above sea level
- Owner: Bane NOR
- Operator: Vy Tåg; LKAB Malmtrafik
- Line: Ofotbanen
- Distance: 36.05 kilometres (22.40 mi)

Other information
- Station code: SØS

History
- Opened: 1955 / 1988
Location

Søsterbekk Station (Norwegian: Søsterbekk holdeplass) is a railway station in Narvik Municipality in Nordland county, Norway. It is located along the Ofotbanen railway line, between Katterat Station and Bjørnfjell Station. It has direct railway connections to Narvik, Kiruna, and Luleå.

The station is primarily used by people who have cabins in the area, and is located at an altitude of 457 metres (1,499 ft) above mean sea level. The station was originally opened in 1955, but it was moved in 1988 when a new route was built to circumvent the old and outdated Norddal Bridge that had been built in 1902. There is no road to the station.

Preceding station	Express trains	Following station
Katterat towards Narvik	F8	Bjørnfjell towards Luleå C or Stockholm C
