= Bjørnfjell =

Bjørnfjell may refer to:

- Bjørnfjell, Nordland, a village area in Narvik municipality, Nordland county, Norway
- Bjørnfjell Station, a railway station in the village of Bjørnfjell in Narvik, Norway
- Bjørnfjell Chapel, a chapel in the village of Bjørnfjell in Narvik, Norway
