= Fagernes (Narvik) =

Neighborhood in Narvik, Norway

Fagernes: Fagernes (Norwegian); Čoalbmi (Northern Sami)
- Neighborhood in Narvik
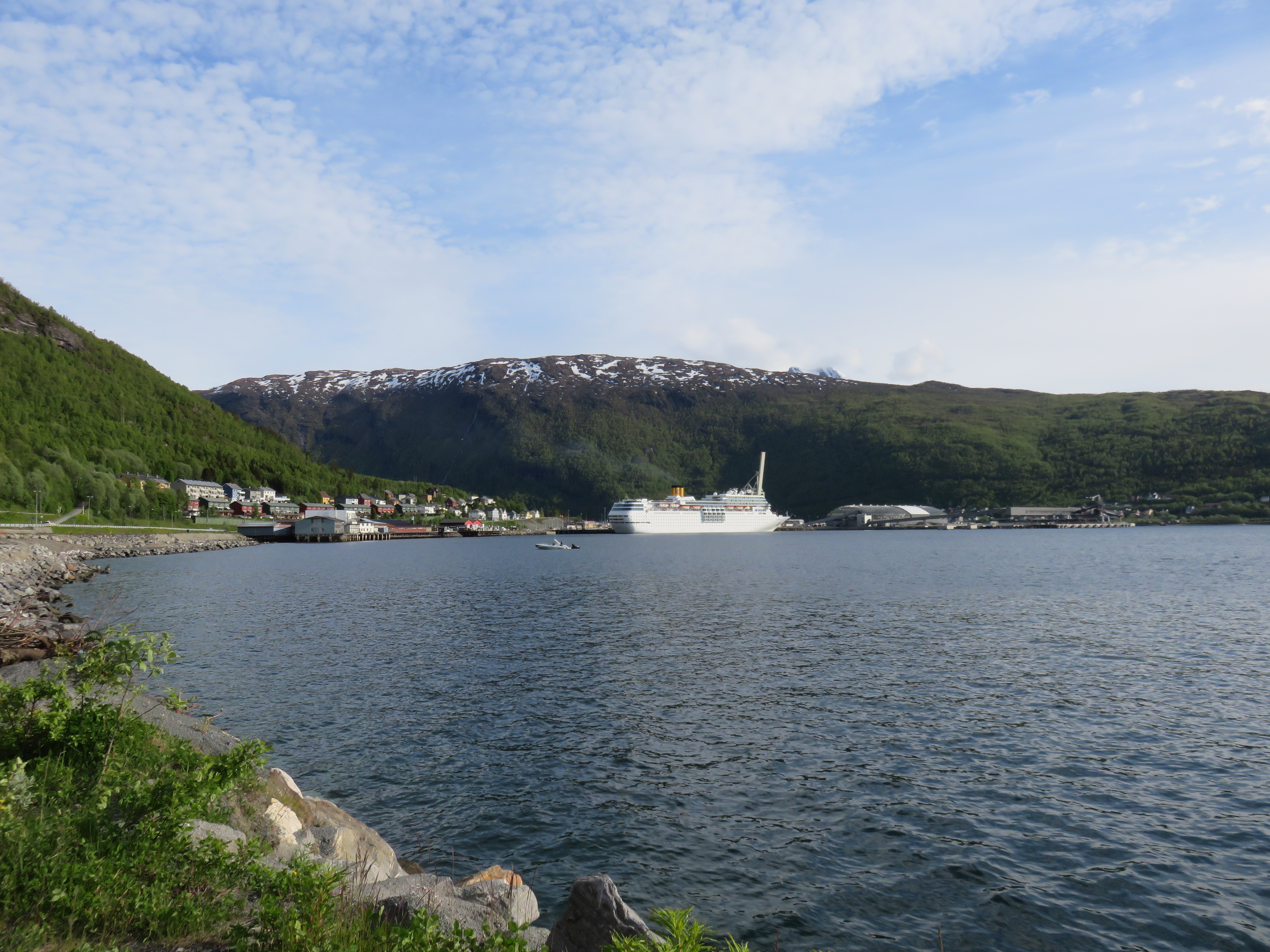
- Part of Fagernes, with the cruise ship and container terminal to the right
- Interactive map of Fagernes
- Location within Nordland Location within Norway
- Coordinates: 68°24′48.6″N 17°25′44.3″E
- Country: Norway
- Region: Northern Norway
- County: Nordland
- District: Ofoten
- Municipality: Narvik Municipality
- Elevation: 12 m (39 ft)
- Time zone: UTC+01:00 (CET)
  - Summer (DST): UTC+02:00 (CEST)
- Post Code: 8501 Narvik

Fagernes (Norwegian) or Čoalbmi (Northern Sami) is a neighborhood in the southern part of the town of Narvik which is located in Narvik Municipality in Nordland county, Norway. Fagernes lies on the north side of Beis Fjord just south of the town centre and southeast of Ankenesstrand (Ankenes). Today, Fagernes is best known as the terminus of the Ofoten Line. The Ofoten Line has its terminus at the Fagernes terminal, a large industrial area of Fagernes.

== History ==
In the 1800s there was a large farm called Fagernes gård ('Fagernes farm') where Fagernes stands today. The farm was the largest and wealthiest in the inner part of the Ofoten district. The area was historically part of Ankenes Municipality. This farm was of central importance in the effort to get the railroad built from Kiruna to Narvik in the late 1800s. The wealthy farmer Statius Mosling (1853–1934) at the Fagernes farm was very eager to have the railroad built to Narvik. It was also due to Mosling that the Ofoten Line ends in Fagernes and not in Narvik. When the town of Narvik was separated from Ankenes Municipality to become its own urban municipality in 1902, Fagernes was also included in the area of the new Narvik Municipality.

== Community ==
Today, Fagernes is a suburban neighborhood of Narvik, mainly consisting of residential buildings and an industrial area called the Fagernes terminal (Norwegian: Fagernesterminalen).

=== Transportation links ===
Fagernes is connected to Narvik to the northwest by European route E6 via the Fagernes Tunnel, which was opened in 2004 and replaced the old road, which went directly through the most densely settled area. To the south, Fagernes is connected to Ankenesstranda (Ankenes), also in the municipality of Narvik, by E6 via the Beisfjord Bridge over Beis Fjord. Further to the east, County Road 751 connects Fagernes to the village of Beisfjord. Fagernes is also connected to Narvik by rail via the Ofoten Line, but this part of the Ofoten Line is only a freight route and there is no passenger transport on the route. Nordland county also offers bus service from Narvik via Fagernes to Beisfjord, Ankenesstranda (Ankenes), and Håkvik.

=== Schools ===
Narvik Montessori School in Fagernes is a primary school offering first- to seventh-grade education. When students have finished seventh grade, they transfer to one of the secondary schools in the city of Narvik. It is located in the premises of the former Fagernes Primary School, which operated from 1957 to 2013. The public school was shut down as an economizing measure in the wake of the municipality of Narvik being added to the ROBEK registry due to involvement in the Terra Securities scandal.
