= Bjørnfjell Station =

Railway station in Narvik Municipality, Norway

Bjørnfjell
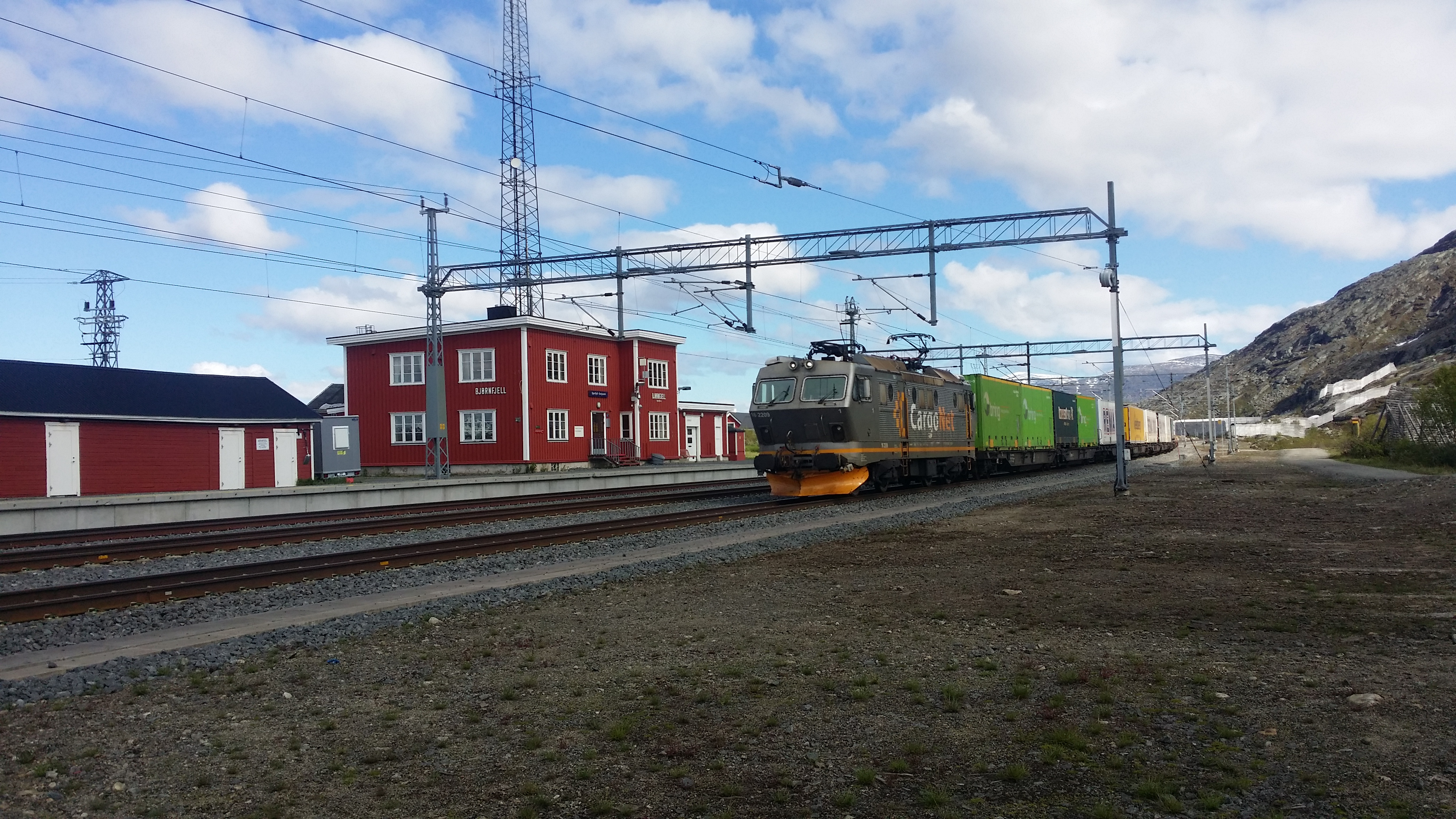
- An Oslo-Narvik Arctic Rail Express freight train passes Bjørnfjell Station

General information
- Location: Narvik Municipality, Nordland county Norway
- Coordinates: 68.4323°N 18.0712°E
- Elevation: 513.9 m (1,686 ft)
- Owner: Bane NOR
- Operator: Vy Tåg; LKAB Malmtrafik
- Line: Ofoten Line
- Distance: 40.42 kilometres (25.12 mi)

Other information
- Station code: BJF

History
- Opened: 1925
Location

Bjørnfjell Station (Norwegian: Bjørnfjell stasjon) is a railway station in the village of Bjørnfjell in Narvik Municipality in Nordland county, Norway. It is located along the Ofotbanen railway line, between Søsterbekk Station and Riksgränsen Station (which is in Sweden). It is about 40 kilometres (25 mi) from Narvik Station and 1.5 kilometres (0.93 mi) from the Swedish border.

The Swedish Iron Ore Line was extended to the town of Narvik in 1902. Increased traffic made a new station between Katterat Station (then Hundalen Station) and the Swedish border desirable, and the Old Bjørnfjell Station was opened in the fall of 1913. The present Bjørnfjell Station, located further east, was opened in 1925. The old station continued to exist as a stop until 1956. The elevation of the current station is 513.9 metres (1,686 ft).

Bjørnfjell, which means "Bear Mountain" in Norwegian, is also the name of the mountain (peak elevation 760 meters) near which the station is located. The European route E10 highway passes through the Bjørnfjell area.

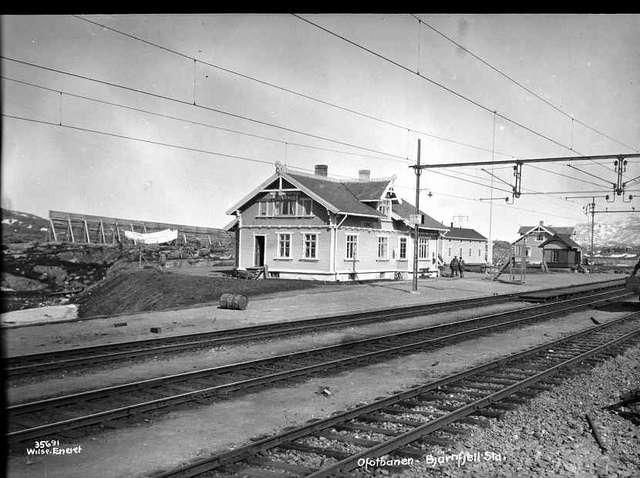
Old Bjørnfjell Station in 1930

| Preceding station | Express trains | Following station |
|---|---|---|
| Søsterbekk towards Narvik | F8 | Riksgränsen towards Luleå C or Stockholm C |
