= Kiruna Central Station =

Railway station in Kiruna, Sweden

Kiruna
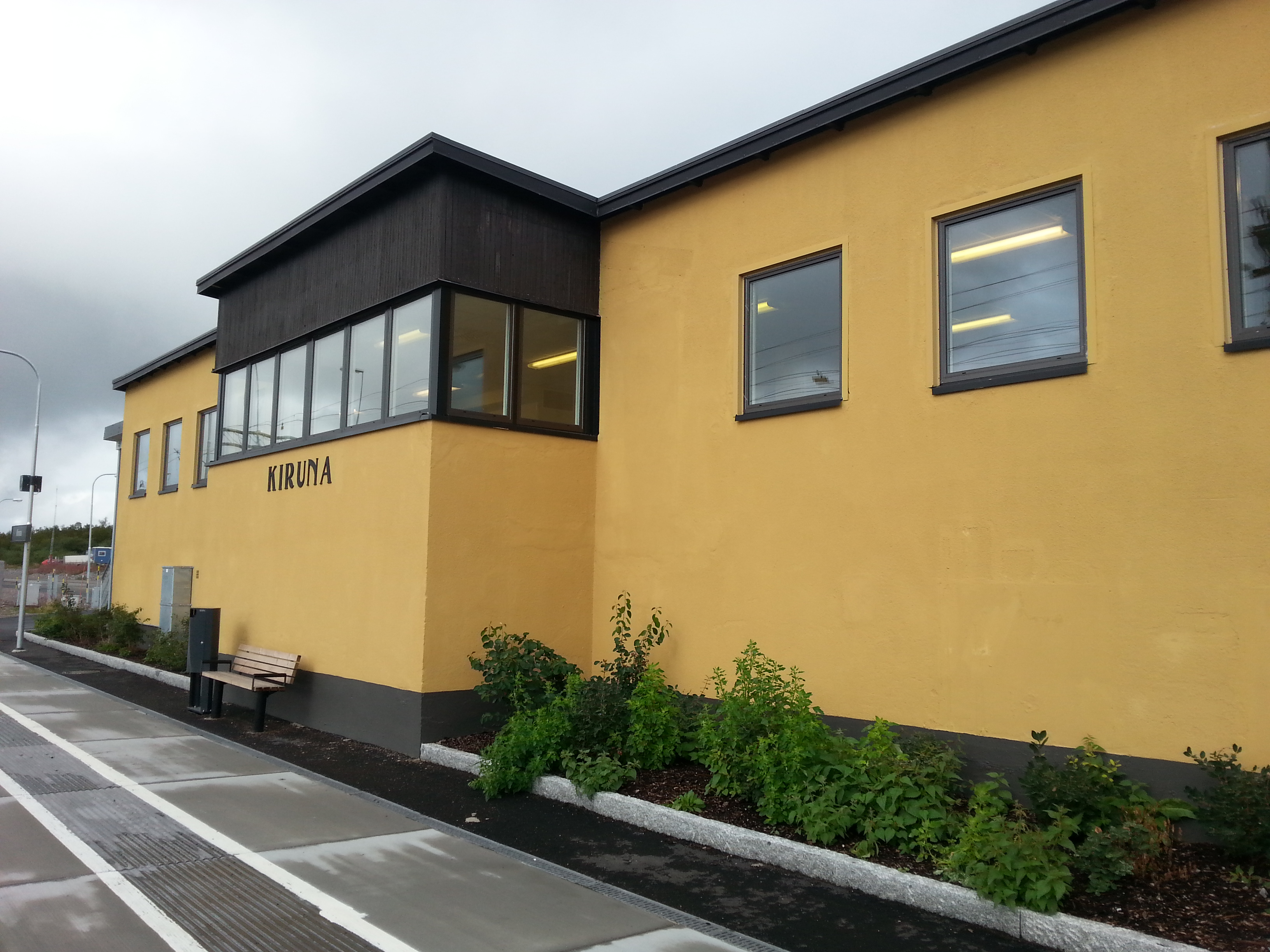
- New Kiruna Central Station building in August 2014

General information
- Location: 1 Lokstallsvägen; Kiruna, Norrbotten County; Sweden
- Coordinates: 67°52′2″N 20°12′3″E
- Line: Iron Ore Line
- Train operators: SJ; Norrtåg

Construction
- Structure type: At-grade
Location

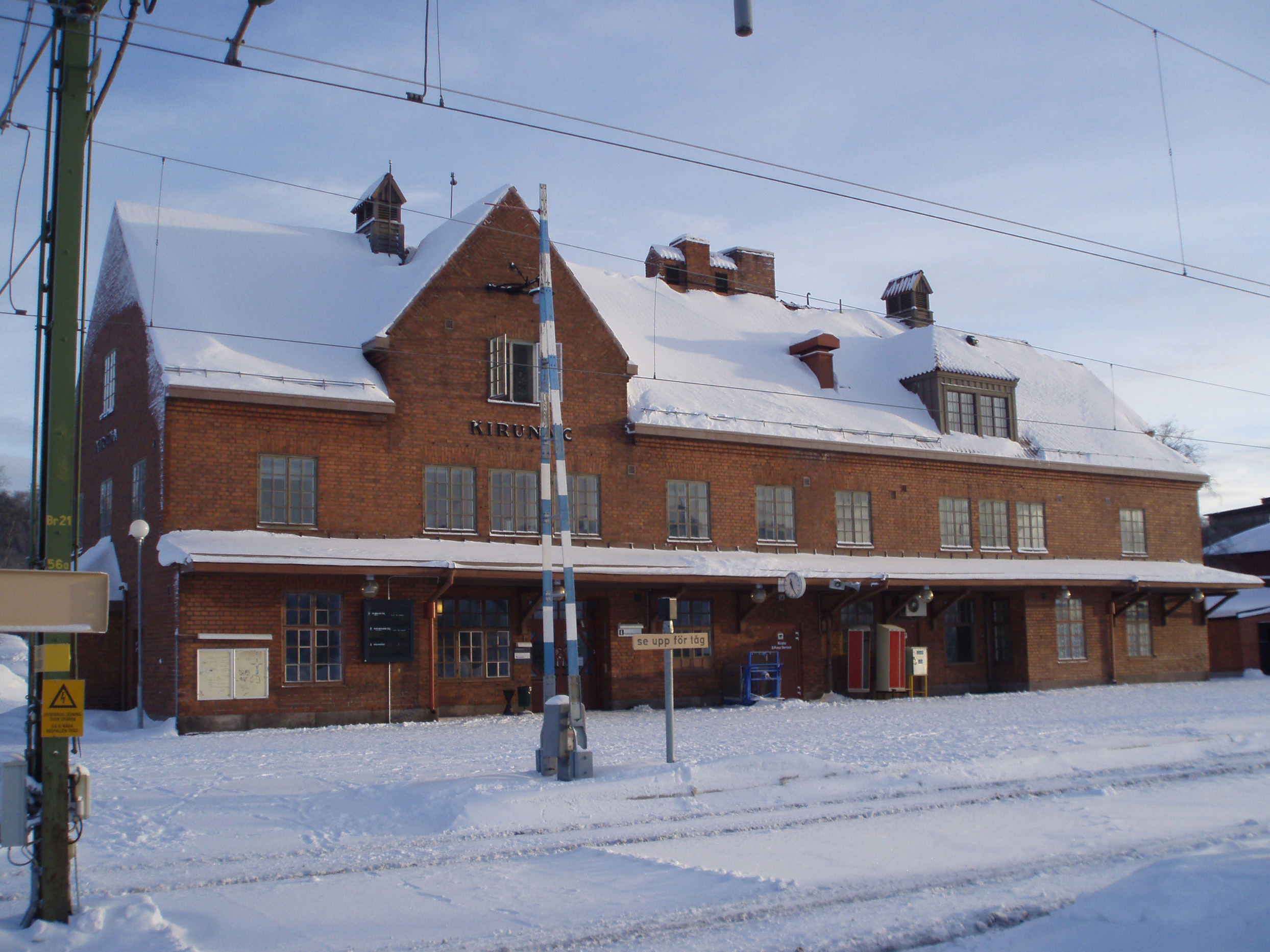
The former Kiruna Central Station

Kiruna Station (Swedish: Kiruna station) is a railway station located on the Iron Ore Line in Kiruna, Sweden. The station is served by up to three daily services northwards on the Iron Ore Line to Narvik Station in Norway. Southwards, the station is served by two daily services to Luleå Central Station and Stockholm Central Station, operated by SJ, and two (week-ends) or three (weekdays) daily services to Luleå Central Station operated by Norrtåg.

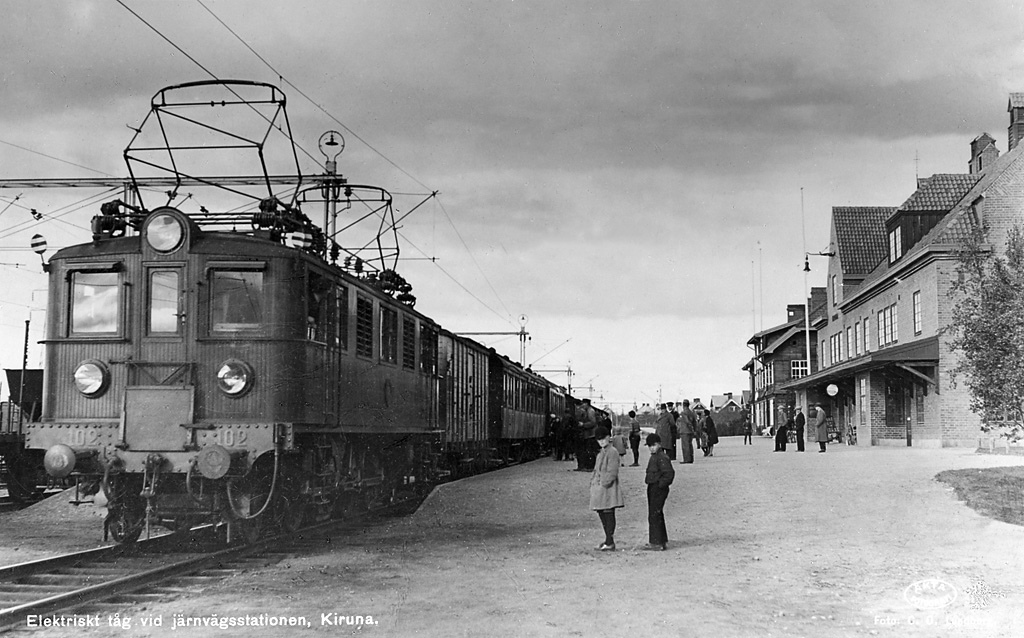
Photo showing an electric SJ D locomotive at the old station, circa 1940-1959.

The old station was located between LKAB's mines and the city center, and was 400 metres (1,300 ft) from Vänorstorget in the city center. In 2013 the a new provisional station in the north east of the town took over the traffic, as the old station is in the area of the iron ore mine. The old station and the station hotel (stations hotellet) was demolished in 2017.
