= Beisfjord =

Village in Narvik Municipality, Norway

Beisfjord: Beisfjord (Norwegian); Ušmá (Northern Sami)
- Village
- Interactive map of Beisfjord
- Location within Nordland Location within Norway
- Coordinates: 68.3762°N 17.5960°E
- Country: Norway
- Region: Northern Norway
- County: Nordland
- District: Ofoten
- Municipality: Narvik Municipality

Area
  - Total: 0.67 km^{2} (0.26 sq mi)
- Elevation: 8 m (26 ft)

Population (2026)
  - Total: 650
  - Density: 970/km^{2} (2,500/sq mi)
- Time zone: UTC+01:00 (CET)
  - Summer (DST): UTC+02:00 (CEST)
- Post Code: 8522 Beisfjord

Beisfjord (Norwegian) or Ušmá (Northern Sami) is a village in Narvik Municipality in Nordland county, Norway. The village is located about 15 kilometres (9.3 mi) southeast of the town of Narvik, at the southeastern end of the 11-kilometre (6.8 mi) long Beis Fjord (an arm off of the large Ofotfjorden). The village sits in a valley surrounded by steep mountains, with the Lakselva river flowing through it and emptying into the fjord. The 0.67-square-kilometre (170-acre) village has a population (2026) of 650 and a population density of 970 inhabitants per square kilometre (2,500/sq mi).

== History ==
Beisfjord was the location of one of the most notorious concentration camps during World War II in Norway. It was called "Lager 1 Beisfjord" (meaning Camp #1 Beisfjord). This was a concentration camp for Yugoslav (mostly Serb) prisoners of war, and later for Soviet POWs. The Yugoslavs consisted of about 900 men, 88 of whom were between 14 and 18 years of age. They were housed there for about six months, until the survivors were transferred out in October 1942.

During one three-week period in July 1942, 311 men died, some from typhus, but most on one day when the German high command ordered all 287 prisoners in the sick quarters to be executed, citing concerns over health risks. All but about 100 were marched to a prepared mass grave and shot (this was known as the Beisfjord massacre). Those who were not yet dead were buried alive. When the remaining 100 prisoners refused to leave the barracks, the Germans doused the place with gasoline and set it on fire. Those who did not burn to death were shot as they tried to escape. In all, during the six-month stay in Beisfjord, about 83% (over 700 prisoners) of the Yugoslavs died.

After the remaining Yugoslavs were transferred out in October 1942, Russian prisoners were brought to Beisfjord and kept there until 1945. In all, 3,500–4,000 Russians had passed through the camp by the war's end.

== Avalanche susceptibility ==
Beisfjord is only connected to Narvik and the outside world through a single road, Norwegian County Road 7570. The road goes along one of the valleys, which leaves the town susceptible to avalanches during the winter.

On 21 January, 2022, the road was hit by a particularly large avalanche, 300 metres wide and 4 metres tall. It closed the road and took down the power supply to the town, as one of the towers to the only power line going into the town was knocked down. Noone was injured from the avalanche, but one came close, when a car almost drove straight into the avalanche due to bad sight. All transport in and out of Beisfjord became boat transport from the marine, and emergency generators were put in place. It took 2 days for the power to return to the town, in the form of a 3.3 km long sea cable that still supplies Beisfjord to this day.

The large incident caused multiple safety precautions for future avalanches to be put in place. The sea cable secured power to the town in the case of another avalanche. Rockfall nettings and radar warning systems were also put in place to prevent people from being caught in future avalanches.

Apart from the one large avalanche, the Beis Fjord has experienced many more minor avalanches, most hitting the side opposite from the road, but still, some over the road.
