= Håkvik =

Village in Narvik Municipality, Norway

Håkvik: Håkvik (Norwegian); Ginnasluokta (Northern Sami); Håkvika (Norwegian)
- Village
- Interactive map of Håkvik
- Location within Nordland Location within Norway
- Coordinates: 68.4052°N 17.3083°E
- Country: Norway
- Region: Northern Norway
- County: Nordland
- District: Ofoten
- Municipality: Narvik Municipality

Area
  - Total: 0.6 km^{2} (0.23 sq mi)
- Elevation: 19 m (62 ft)

Population (2023)
  - Total: 739
  - Density: 1,227/km^{2} (3,180/sq mi)
- Time zone: UTC+01:00 (CET)
  - Summer (DST): UTC+02:00 (CEST)
- Post Code: 8520 Ankenesstrand

Håkvik (Norwegian) or Ginnasluokta (Northern Sami) is a village in Narvik Municipality in Nordland county, Norway. The village is located along the southern shore of the Ofotfjorden, southwest of the town of Narvik and the village of Ankenesstranda. Håkvik Chapel was built here in 1980. The European route E6 highway runs through the village.

The 0.6-square-kilometre (150-acre) village has a population (2023) of 736 which gives the village a population density of 1,227 inhabitants per square kilometre (3,180/sq mi).
