= Beisfjord Bridge =

Beisfjord Bridge Beisfjordbrua
- Coordinates: 68°24′26″N 17°25′20″E
- Carries: E6
- Crosses: Beisfjorden
- Locale: Narvik Municipality, Norway
- Other name: Ankenesbrua

Characteristics
- Total length: 375 metres (1,230 ft)

History
- Opened: 1959

Location
- Interactive map of Beisfjord Bridge

The Beisfjord Bridge (Norwegian: Beisfjordbrua) is a girder bridge in Narvik Municipality in Nordland county, Norway. The concrete bridge crosses the Beisfjorden on the west side of the town of Narvik. The 375-metre-long (1,230 ft) bridge connects Ankenesstranda, a residential area on the west side of Narvik, southwest of the fjord, to Fagernes, a neighborhood on the outskirts of Narvik. Most of the population is on the northeastern side. The bridge carries the European route E6 highway and it was completed in 1959.

== History ==
The first Beisfjord bridge was first opened in 1943 during the German occupation of Narvik as a temporary solution to the crossing between Narvik and Ankenes.

The current bridge came into being after the old German bridge was mostly demolished, and the new, current bridge, was opened in 1959.

There still exists minor remnants of the original, German-built bridge, as some wooden girders remain to the sides of the current bridge, just barely above the water.

== See also ==
- List of bridges in Norway
- List of bridges
