= North Bothnia Line =

Proposed high-speed railway line in Sweden

North Bothnia Line Norrbotniabanan

Overview
- Status: Umeå–Dåva: Under construction; Dåva–Skellefteå: Under construction; Skellefteå–Luleå: Planned (2032 or 2033)
- Locale: Sweden
- Termini: Umeå; Luleå

Service
- Type: High-speed railway
- System: Swedish railway

History
- Planned opening: Umeå–Dåva: 2026; Dåva–Skellefteå: 2032 or 2036–2038; Skellefteå–Luleå: TBD

Technical
- Line length: 270 km (170 mi)
- Number of tracks: 1
- Track gauge: 1,435 mm (4 ft 8 1/2 in)
- Electrification: 15 kV 16.7 Hz AC
- Operating speed: 250 km/h (155 mph)

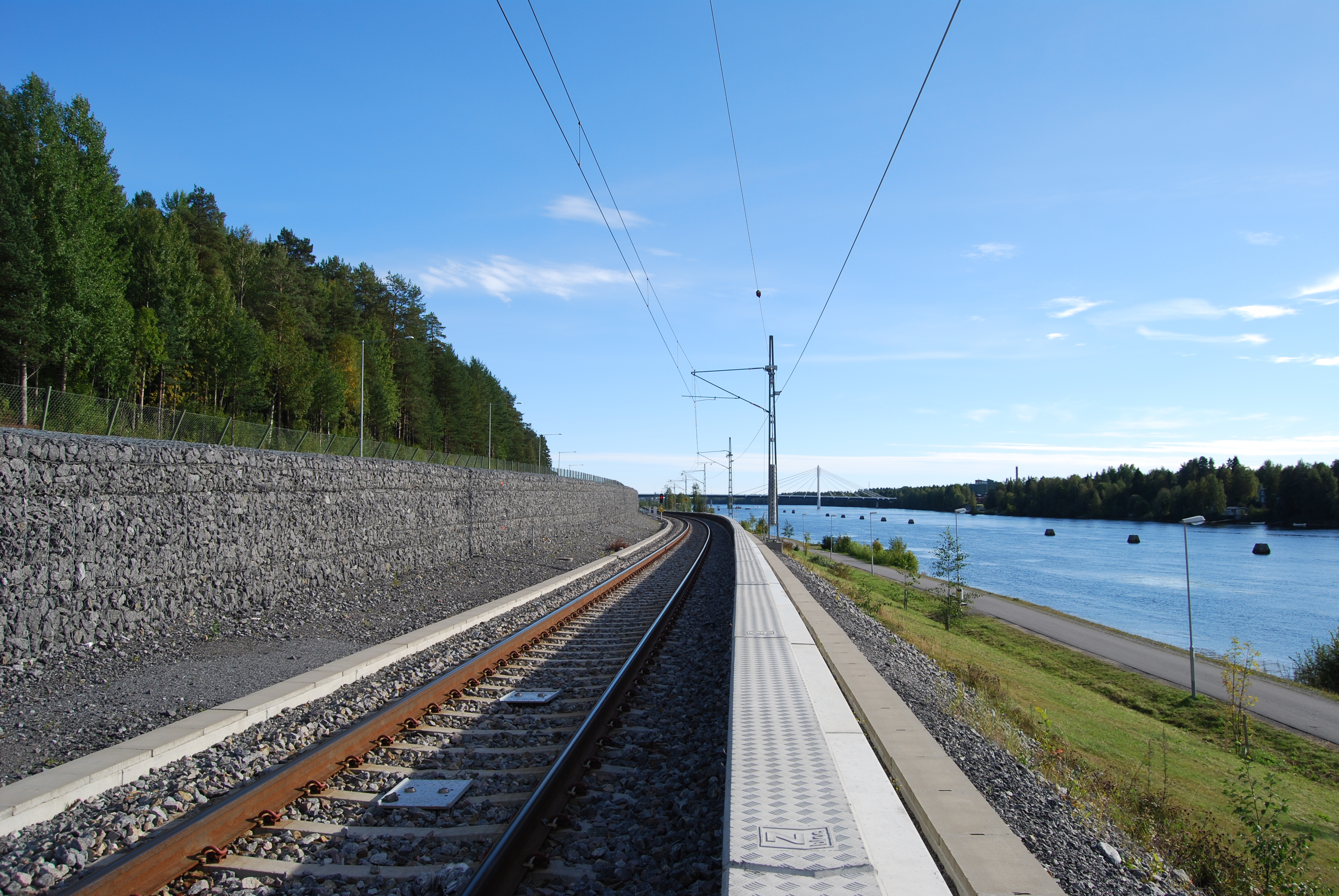
The line will operate as a northern extension of the Bothnia Line

The North Bothnia Line (Swedish: Norrbotniabanan) is high-speed railway line partially under construction between Umeå Central Station and Luleå Central Station in Sweden. The line will be 270 kilometres (170 mi) long and be a northern extension of the Bothnia Line, which opened in 2010. The planned line is expected to improve accessibility between the larger cities along northern Sweden's coast, and to handle 1.6 million passengers per year.

The entire North Bothnia Line project is estimated to cost approximately 40 billion SEK at 2021 price levels. It will include the construction of 550 kilometres of roads, about 250 bridges, main stations in Skellefteå, Piteå, and Luleå, as well as regional train stations in Sävar, Robertsfors, Bureå, and Byske.

== Background and route ==
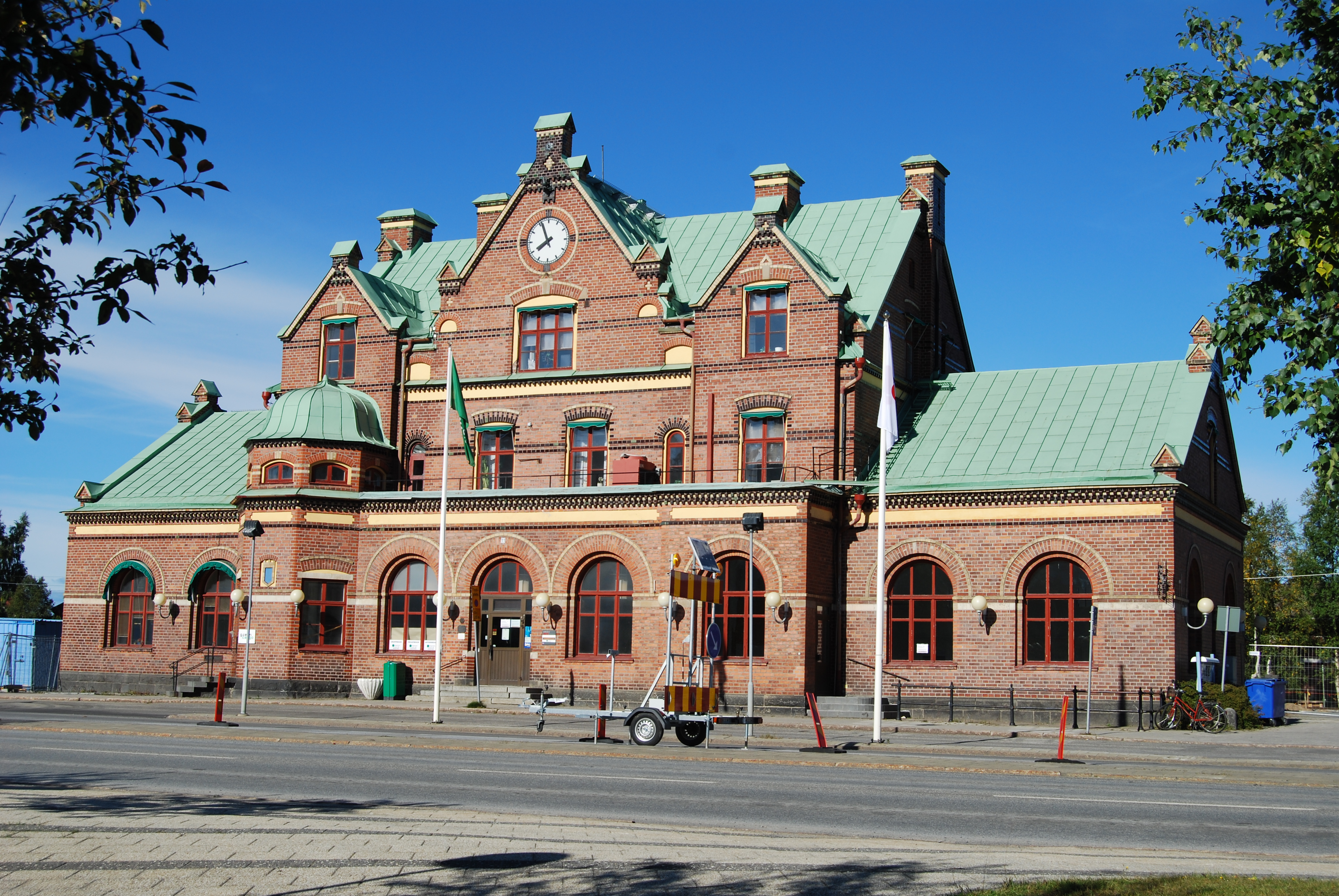
The line will start at Umeå Central Station

Currently, the area is served by the Main Line Through Upper Norrland, which first opened in 1894, and is located inland and with branch lines connected to various towns along the coast. To the north, the North Bothnia Line will connect with the Main Line Through Upper Norrland and onwards along the Haparanda Line to connect to the Barents Region and the Finnish railway network. It will also connect to the Iron Ore Line. The project is estimated to cost 23 billion Swedish kronor (SEK).

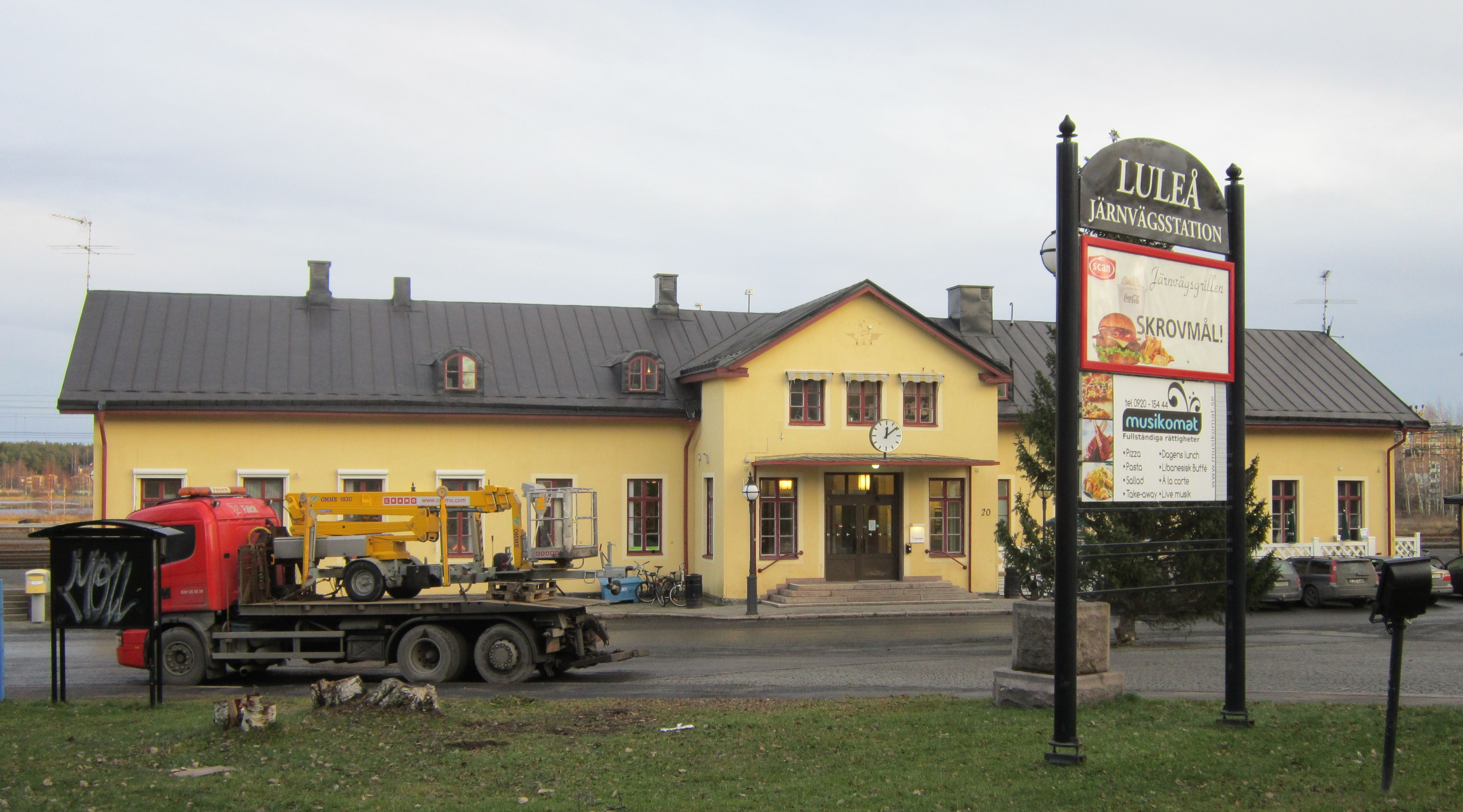
The line is planned to run to Luleå Central Station

The North Bothnia Line will connect to Stockholm via the Bothnia Line, the Ådalen Line and the East Coast Line. The Main Line Through Upper Norrland has a maximum permitted train weight of 1,100 tonnes (1,100 long tons; 1,200 short tons) per Rc locomotive, while the North Bothnia Line will be built for 1,600 tonnes (1,600 long tons; 1,800 short tons) and will reduce transport distance by 70 to 110 kilometres (43 to 68 mi) for many freight routes. An upgrade of the Main Line has been considered, but because of the curvy right-of-way most of the line would have to be built in an all-new right-of-way, which would raise costs to about the same as a new line. In addition, the Main Line's inland route makes it unsuitable for regional passenger services and gives longer distances. Travel time from Umeå to Luleå for passenger trains will be 90 minutes, compared to over 4 hours for buses or trains today.

== Construction ==
Construction of the initial 12-kilometre (7.5 mi) section from Umeå to Dåva industrial area began on 23 August 2018. This segment, which includes a new railway tunnel through Ersmarksberget in Umeå, is scheduled to open for initial freight traffic in 2026.

For the Dåva–Skellefteå section, preparation of construction documents and planning have been underway since 2021. Minor preparatory work, such as land acquisition, has commenced, with the goal of starting construction in 2025. In February 2025, the Swedish government announced funding of 17.7 billion SEK for the Dåva–Skellefteå stretch.

Planning for the Skellefteå–Luleå section has been initiated. The project organisation is being developed, and the creation of railway plans has begun. In March 2025, Trafikverket opened public consultation on the proposed routes through central Piteå, presenting three alternatives for an 8-kilometre (5.0 mi) stretch through the town.

There has been a debate about the entrance into Luleå. Trafikverket has preliminary decided to follow road E4 and enter midtown from west along the existing railway, while local politicians want a route towards the east side of midtown, which would require a movable bridge over the bay.
