= Katterat Station =

Railway station in Narvik Municipality, Norway

Katterat (formerly: Hundalen)
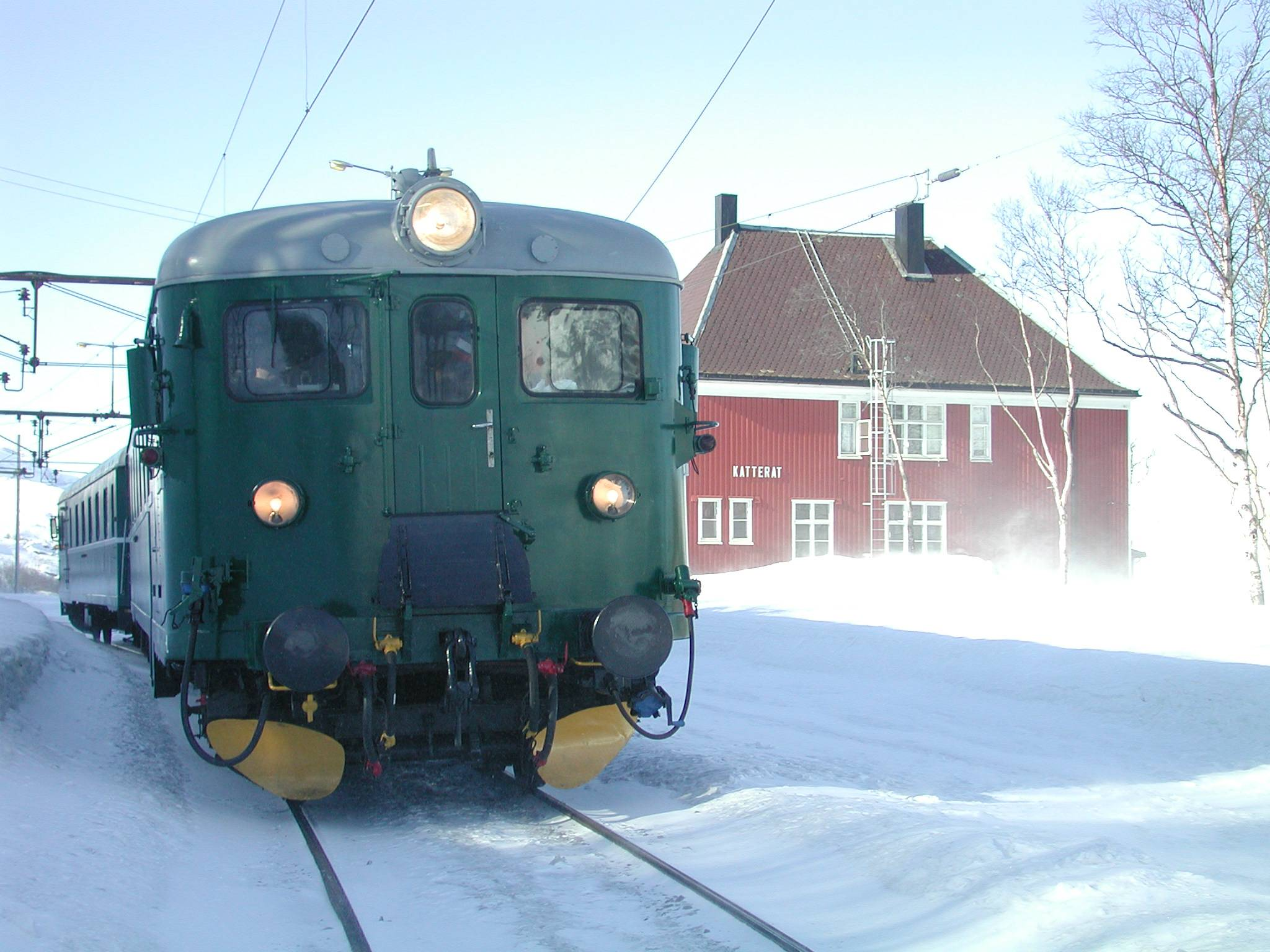

General information
- Location: Narvik Municipality, Nordland county Norway
- Coordinates: 68°23′52″N 17°57′57″E
- Elevation: 373.5 metres (1,225 ft) above sea level
- Owner: Bane NOR
- Operator: Vy Tåg; LKAB Malmtrafik
- Line: Ofoten Line
- Distance: 29.73 kilometres (18.47 mi)

Other information
- Station code: KAT

History
- Opened: 1902
Location

Katterat Station (Norwegian: Katterat stasjon) is a railway station in Narvik Municipality in Nordland county, Norway. The station is located along the Ofotbanen railway line, between Rombak Station and Søsterbekk Station.

== History ==
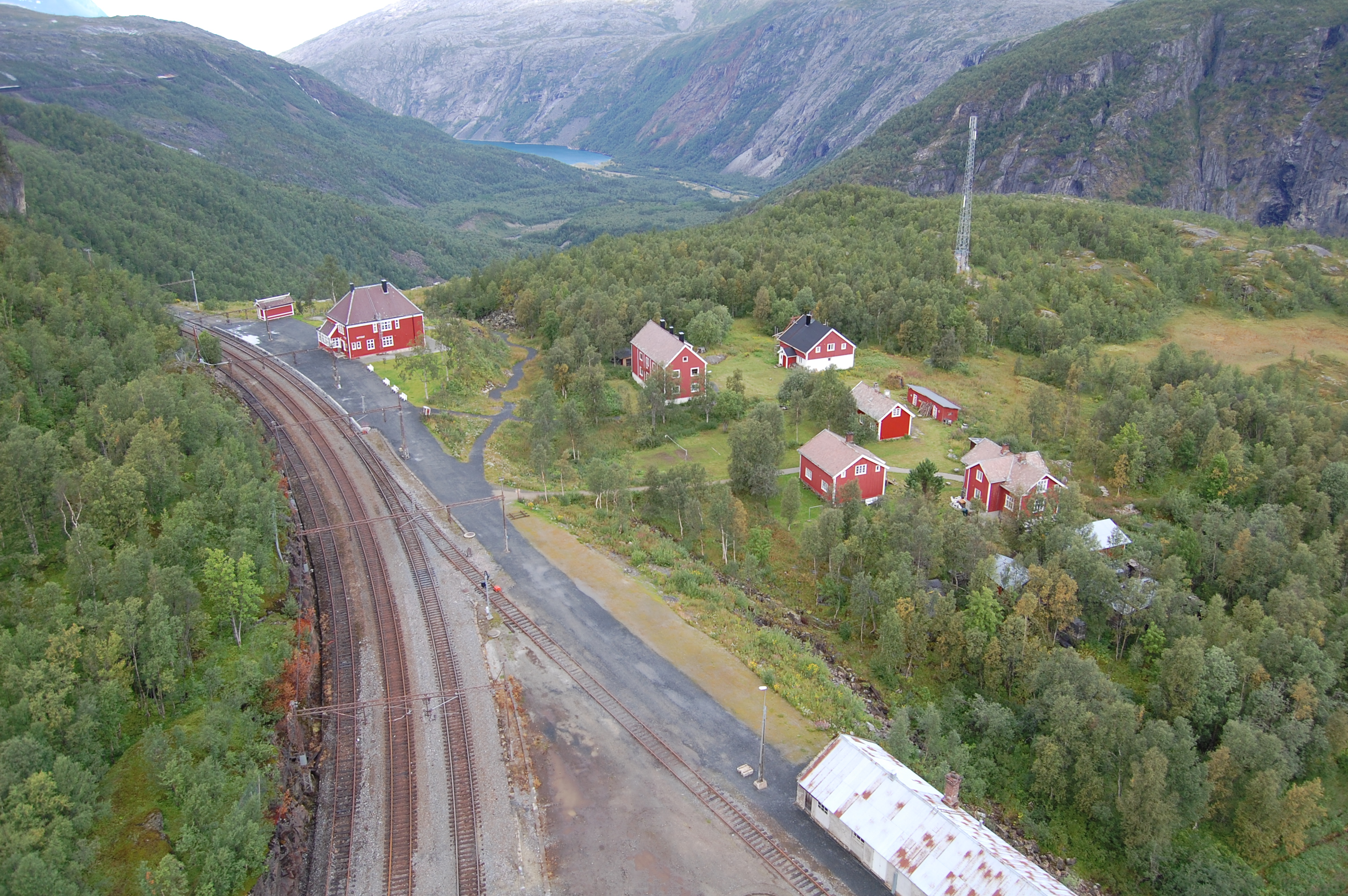
Katterat Station

The station was built in 1902 and it was originally called Hundalen. In 1951, the station was renamed Katterat which is based on the Sami name Gátterčohkka. There is no road to Katterat station, the only arrival is by train or by foot. Until the operation of the track was remotely controlled in the 1960s, there was a small, permanent settlement on site. Today the area is popular for hiking providing cabins and several hiking trails starting at Katterat Station.

Preceding station	Express trains	Following station
Rombak towards Narvik	F8	Søsterbekk towards Luleå C or Stockholm C
