= Narvik (town) =

Town in Narvik Municipality, Norway

Narvik: Narvik (Norwegian); Áhkánjárga (Northern Sami); Victorianhamina (Kven); Victoriahavn (historic name)
- Town/City
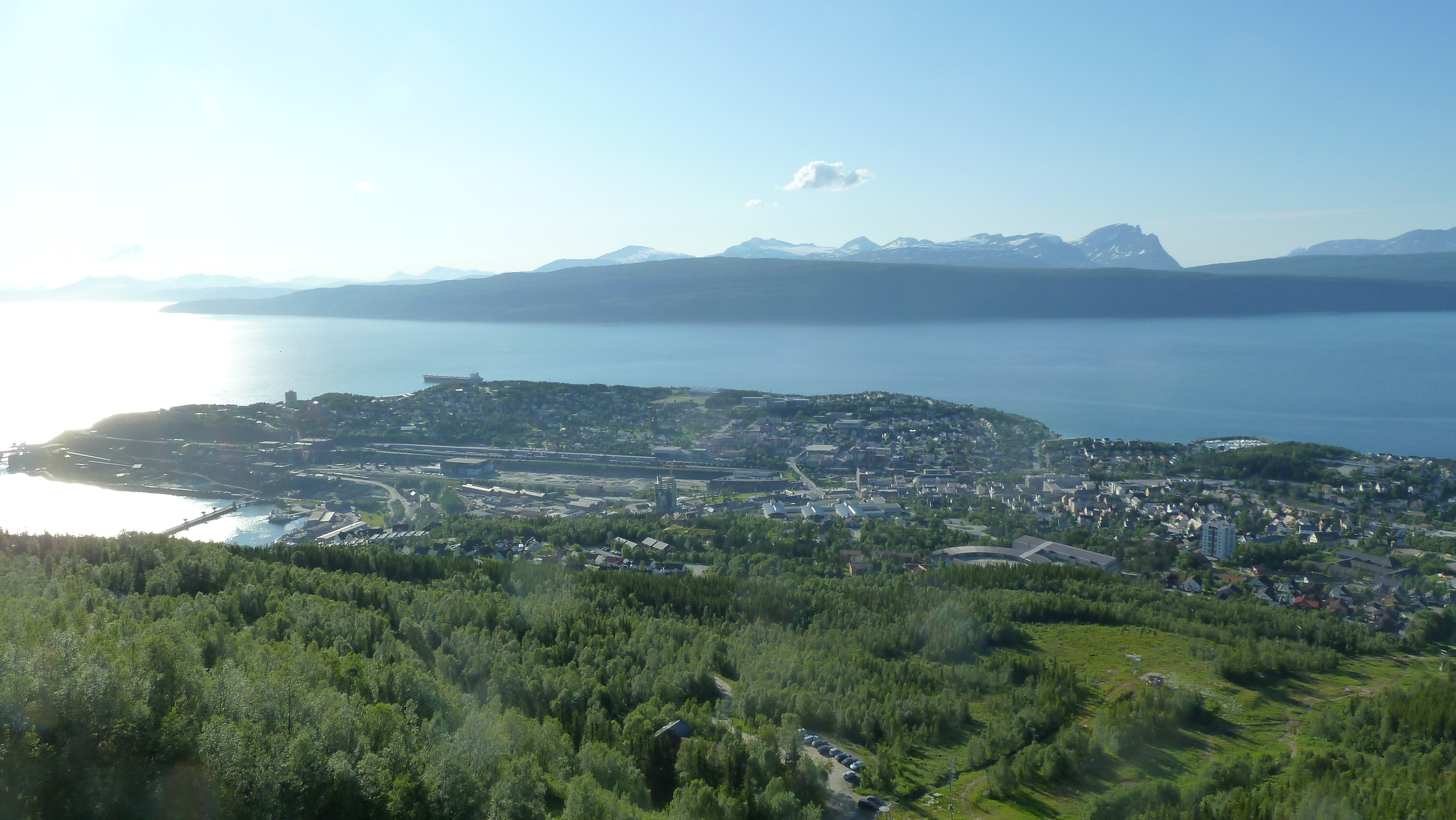
- View of the town
- Interactive map of Narvik
- Location within Nordland Location within Norway
- Coordinates: 68.4363°N 17.3983°E
- Country: Norway
- Region: Northern Norway
- County: Nordland
- District: Ofoten
- Municipality: Narvik Municipality
- Established as
- Kjøpstad: 1 Jan 1902

Area
  - Total: 6.93 km^{2} (2.68 sq mi)
- Elevation: 87 m (285 ft)

Population (2023)
  - Total: 14,051
  - Density: 2,028/km^{2} (5,250/sq mi)
- Demonyms: Narviking; Narvikværing
- Time zone: UTC+01:00 (CET)
  - Summer (DST): UTC+02:00 (CEST)
- Post Code: 8514 Narvik

Narvik (Norwegian) or Áhkánjárga (Northern Sami) is a town and the administrative centre of Narvik Municipality in Nordland county, Norway. The town is located along the Ofotfjorden in the Ofoten region. The town lies on a peninsula located between the Rombaken fjord and the Beisfjorden. The European route E06 highway runs through the Beisfjord Bridge and Hålogaland Bridge crossing the two small fjords surrounding the town.

The 6.93-square-kilometre (1,710-acre) town has a population (2023) of 14,051 which gives the town a population density of 2,028 inhabitants per square kilometre (5,250/sq mi).

Narvik Church is the main church for the town. Narvik is a commercial centre for the region. The Narvik campus of the University of Tromsø has approximately 1,200 students in the town. There are some high-tech businesses in Narvik (among them Natech).

== Etymology ==
The town is named after the old Narvik farm (Old Norse: Knarravík or Njarðarvík) since the town was built there. The two possible Old Norse roots have differing meanings. If it comes from Knarravík, then the meaning of the first element is the genitive plural form of knǫrr or knarr which means "merchant ship". The other option is that the name is derived from Njarðarvík. In that case, the first element comes from the old pagan god name Njǫrðr. Both options share the same last element, vík, which means "inlet". Historically, the name was spelled Narduigh or Narvigen.

The harbour in the town of Narvik was once called Victoriahavn after Queen Victoria of the United Kingdom, however Sweden's Crown Princess Victoria was also honoured.

== History ==
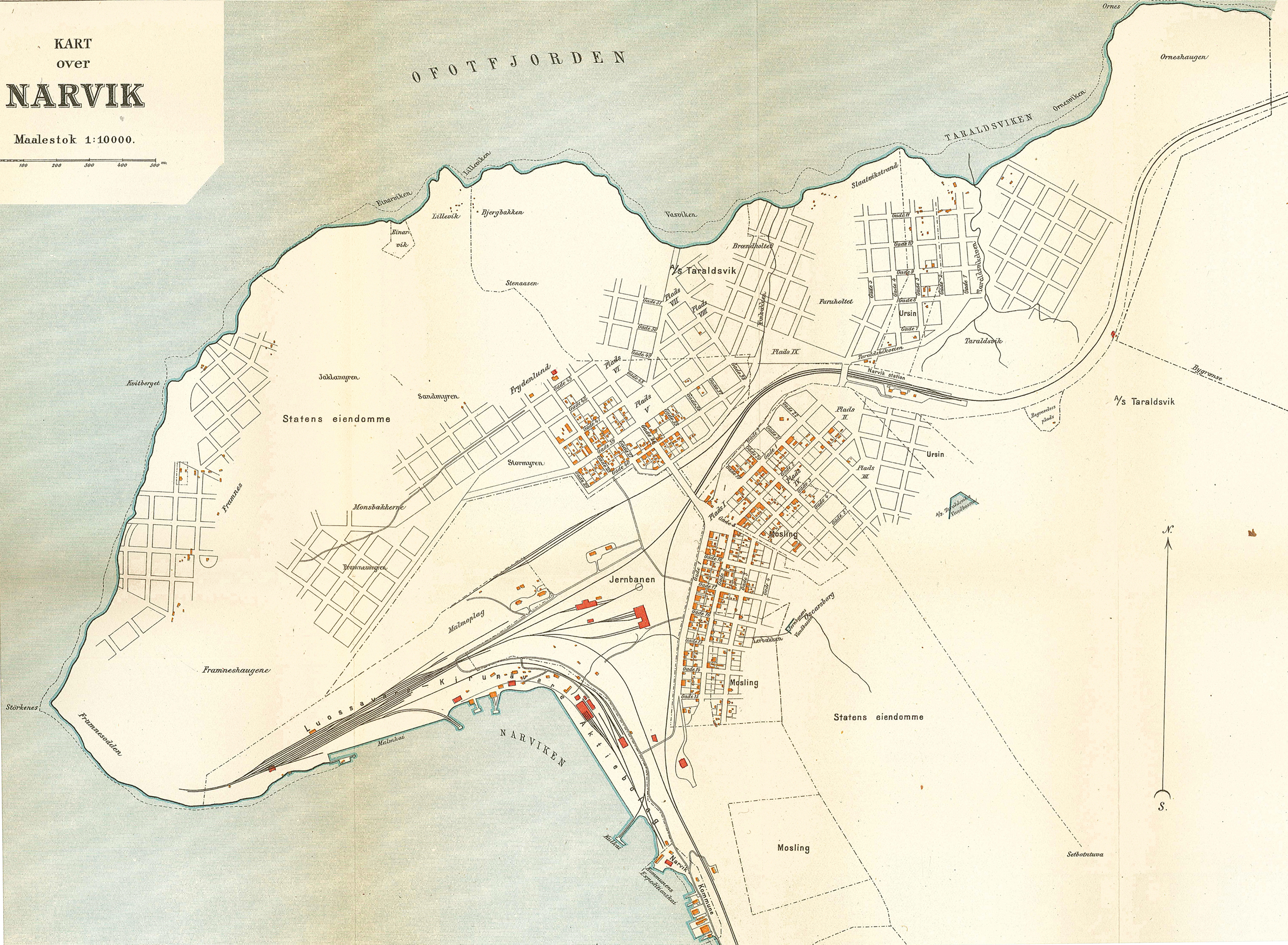
Map of Narvik in 1907

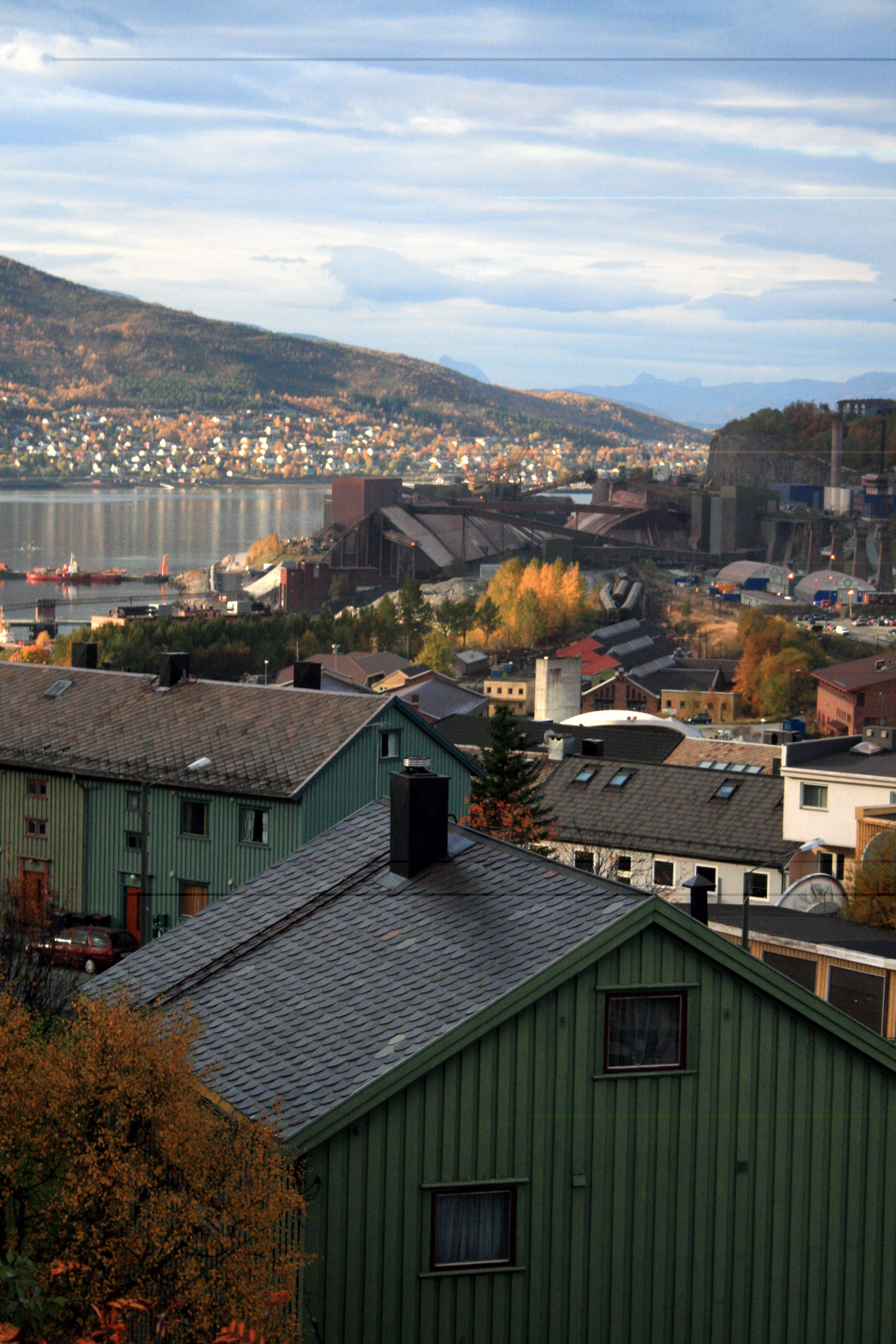
Near Narvik city centre; Ankenes is seen across the bay

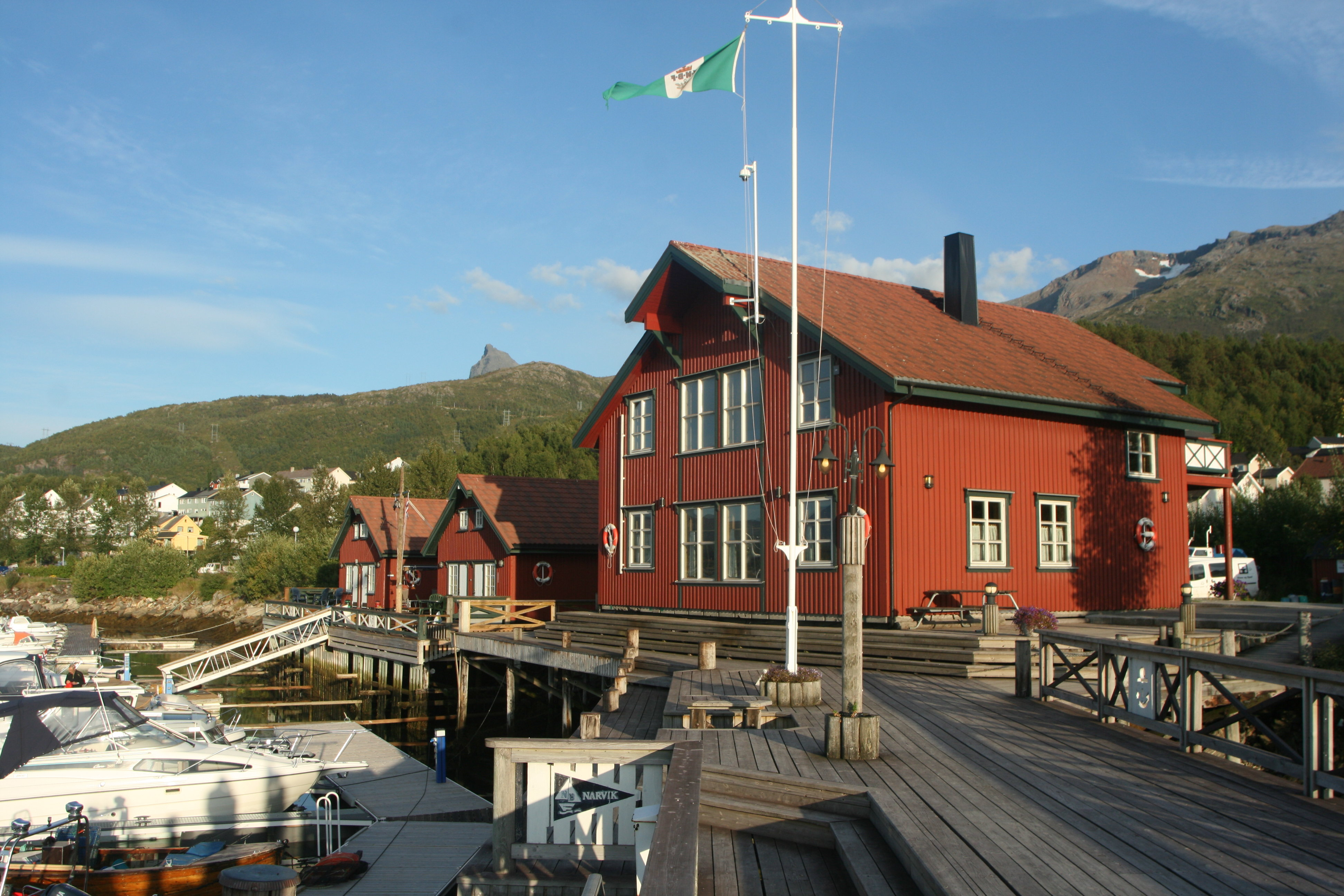
Narvik guest harbor

The history of Narvik as a settlement began in the Bronze Age. Not very much is known about these people, but the Vikings lived in this area.

Narvik was developed as an all-year ice free port for the Swedish Kiruna and Gällivare iron mines. The history of modern Narvik begins in the 1870s, when the Swedish government began to understand the potential of the iron ore mines in Kiruna, Sweden. Obtaining iron ore from Kiruna had one significant problem in that there was no suitable Swedish port. The nearest Swedish port, Luleå, had limitations. It was covered with ice all winter, far from Kiruna, and allows only medium-sized bulk freight vessels. Narvik offered a port which is ice-free thanks to the warm Gulf Stream and is naturally large, allowing ships of virtually any size to anchor, up to 208 metres (682 ft) long and 27 metres (89 ft) deep. The Swedish company (Gällivare Aktiebolag) built the Iron Ore Line (Malmbanan) to Riksgränsen on the Norway–Sweden border. The Norwegian Ofotbanen railway line connects Narvik to the Swedish border.

Swedish mining corporation LKAB still ships the majority of its ore from Narvik (a total 25 million tons a year). The corporation is still important in the area, both as an employer and landowner, although its influence is not as prominent now as it has been in previous years.

The town of Narvik was established as a kjøpstad on 1 January 1902 when the village of Narvik received status as a proper town and was separated from the large Ankenes Municipality so it could have its own municipal government. Initially, the town-municipality of Narvik had 3,705 residents. On 1 January 1974, Ankenes Municipality was merged with the town-municipality of Narvik, forming a new, larger Narvik Municipality.

=== World War II ===
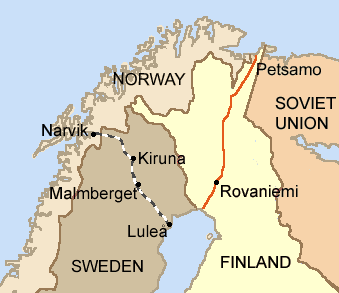
Iron ore is extracted in Kiruna and Malmberget and brought by rail to the harbours of Luleå and Narvik. (Borders as of 1920–1940)

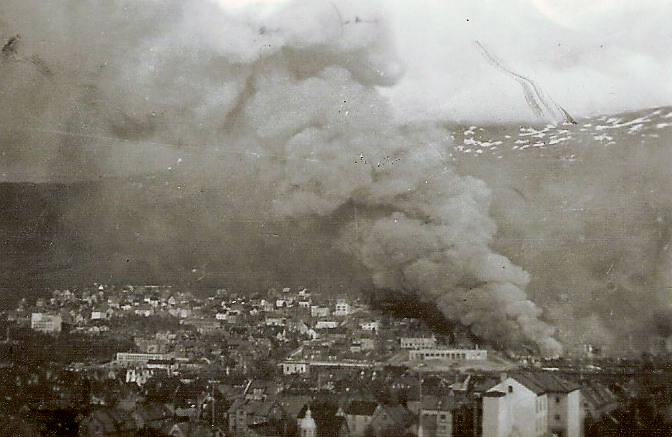
Narvik burning after German bombing, 2 June 1940

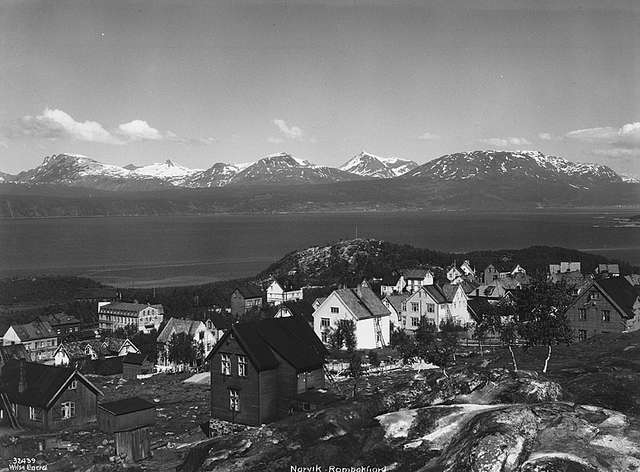
Narvik 1928 with the fjord Rombaken as backdrop

The port of Narvik proved to be strategically valuable in the early years of World War II and the town became a focal point of the Norwegian Campaign. In 1939, Germany's war industry depended upon iron ore mined in Kiruna and Malmberget in Sweden. During the summer season, this ore could be sent by cargo ship to Germany through the Baltic Sea via the Swedish port of Luleå on the Gulf of Bothnia. However, when the Gulf of Bothnia froze during the winter, more shipments of the ore needed to be transported through Narvik and, from there, down the west coast of Norway to Germany. The town of Narvik is linked by rail to Sweden, but not to any other towns in Norway. As a result, Narvik serves as a gateway to the ore fields of Sweden that cannot be easily reached from southern Norway via land. Winston Churchill realised that the control of Narvik meant stopping most German imports of iron ore during the winter of 1940. This would be advantageous to the Allies and it might help shorten the war. Equally as important, later in the war, German submarines and warships based there threatened the allied supply line to the Soviet Union.

Churchill proposed laying a naval minefield in Norwegian territorial waters around Narvik (referred to as "the Leads") or else occupying the town with Allied troops. The Allies hoped that they might be able to use an occupied Narvik as a base from which to secure the Swedish ore fields and/or to send supplies and reinforcements to Finland, then fighting the Finnish Winter War with the Soviet Union. Plans to lay a minefield around Narvik or to seize the town met with debate within the British government – since both plans would mean a violation of Norway's neutrality and sovereignty.

Finally, on 8 April 1940, the British Admiralty launched Operation Wilfred, an attempt to lay anti-shipping minefields around Narvik in Norwegian territorial waters. Coincidentally, Germany launched its invasion of Norway (Operation Weserübung) the next day. During this invasion, ten German destroyers, each carrying 200 mountain infantry soldiers, were sent to Narvik. The outdated Norwegian coastal defence ships HNoMS Eidsvold and HNoMS Norge attempted to resist the invasion, but both were sunk after a short and uneven battle. The Royal Navy quickly dispatched several ships to Narvik, including the battleship HMS Warspite and during the Battles of Narvik, the British took control of the coast, destroying the German destroyers that had brought the invasion force to Narvik, as well as other German ships in the area.

On 12 April 1940, the first convoys of Allied soldiers were sent under Major-General Pierse Joseph Mackesy to Narvik. The Admiralty urged Mackesy to conduct an assault on Narvik from the sea as soon as possible. However, Mackesy believed that the German harbour defences were too strong for such an invasion to take place. The Admiralty argued that a naval bombardment of Norway would enable the troops to land safely, but General Mackesy refused to subject Norwegian citizens to such a bombardment and instead he chose to land his troops near Narvik and wait until the snow melted to take over the town.

Coordinated by the Norwegian General Carl Gustav Fleischer, Norwegian, French, Polish and British forces recaptured Narvik on 28 May 1940. This is also considered the first Allied infantry victory in World War II. However, by that time, the Allies were losing the Battle of France and the evacuation from Dunkirk was underway. Since the Nazi German invasion of France had made Scandinavia largely irrelevant and, since the valuable troops assigned to Narvik were badly needed elsewhere, the Allies withdrew from Narvik on 8 June 1940 in Operation Alphabet. The same day, while operating in the Narvik area, the German battleships Scharnhorst and Gneisenau sank the British aircraft carrier HMS Glorious during the withdrawal from this battle. Without support from the Allied naval task force, the Norwegians were outnumbered and they had to lay down their arms in Norway on 10 June 1940. This was not a complete capitulation, since the Norwegians kept on fighting guerrilla operations inland.

Possession of the Ofotfjord was also important to the German Kriegsmarine (navy) since it provided a refuge for warships like the "pocket battleship" Lützow and the battleship Tirpitz outside the range (at the time) of air attacks from Scotland. Also, U-boats could possibly be based at Narvik.

== Climate ==
Climate data for Narvik Airport, Framnes 1991–2020 (31 m, avg high/low 2003-2016, avg high/low 2019-2025 from Narvik Sentrum, precipitation Narvik III, extremes 1954-2020 includes earlier stations)
Month	Jan	Feb	Mar	Apr	May	Jun	Jul	Aug	Sep	Oct	Nov	Dec	Year
Record high °C (°F)	11.5 (52.7)	9.0 (48.2)	12.5 (54.5)	20.4 (68.7)	29.9 (85.8)	30.0 (86.0)	32.5 (90.5)	28.6 (83.5)	27.2 (81.0)	19.6 (67.3)	15.8 (60.4)	11.4 (52.5)	32.5 (90.5)
Mean daily maximum °C (°F)	−0.8 (30.6)	0.1 (32.2)	2.2 (36.0)	6.2 (43.2)	11.4 (52.5)	15.5 (59.9)	19.1 (66.4)	17.7 (63.9)	12.9 (55.2)	7.1 (44.8)	3.2 (37.8)	1.2 (34.2)	8.0 (46.4)
Daily mean °C (°F)	−2.3 (27.9)	−2.7 (27.1)	−0.8 (30.6)	2.9 (37.2)	7.4 (45.3)	11.4 (52.5)	14.5 (58.1)	13.5 (56.3)	9.4 (48.9)	4.5 (40.1)	1.2 (34.2)	−0.8 (30.6)	4.9 (40.7)
Mean daily minimum °C (°F)	−5.6 (21.9)	−4.9 (23.2)	−3.4 (25.9)	−0.1 (31.8)	4.1 (39.4)	8.2 (46.8)	11.4 (52.5)	10.5 (50.9)	7.0 (44.6)	2.4 (36.3)	−1.2 (29.8)	−3.5 (25.7)	2.1 (35.7)
Record low °C (°F)	−20.0 (−4.0)	−22.3 (−8.1)	−15.7 (3.7)	−11.8 (10.8)	−5.0 (23.0)	−1.0 (30.2)	4.5 (40.1)	0.5 (32.9)	−3.5 (25.7)	−11.1 (12.0)	−13.6 (7.5)	−19.0 (−2.2)	−22.3 (−8.1)
Average precipitation mm (inches)	108 (4.3)	98 (3.9)	82 (3.2)	44 (1.7)	56 (2.2)	57 (2.2)	88 (3.5)	91 (3.6)	107 (4.2)	107 (4.2)	99 (3.9)	97 (3.8)	1,034 (40.7)
Source 1: Norwegian Meteorological Institute
Source 2: Seklima (avg highs/lows)

== Culture ==
Narvik's culture is heavily influenced by its role as an iron-ore port city and its large role during the Second World War. Major cultural attractions in Narvik include the two major museums, Narvik Museum and Narvik War Museum, and Narvik Culture Center. The Narvik Winter Festival is also very important to the culture in Narvik. The festival has been hosted annually since 1956.

=== Museums ===
Narvik has 3 museums, Narvik Museum, Narvik War Museum and Narvik Vehicle History Museum.

Narvik Museum focuses on the history of the Ofoten line and Narvik Port.

Narvik War Museum focuses on war and conflict from the Second World War to today, and is run by one of the Norwegian Peace and Human Rights Centres.

The Narvik Vehicle History Museum focuses on the history and development of transport and conveyance in Narvik.

=== Music and events ===
The Narvik Winter Festival is one of the biggest festivals in Narvik. It features concerts, exhibitions and theater.

Haikjeften is a major music festival held annually in Narvik. The festival hosted Marcus & Martinus in 2026.

=== Sports ===
Narvik is home to football club FK Mjølner, which played in the Norwegian Top Division in 1972 and 1989, as well as being the first Northern Norwegian club to play in the Norwegian Top Division. Narvik is home to Nordpolen FF, formerly a futsal club, they played in the Norwegian Top Division for futsal in the 2017/18 season. Nordpolen FF is now a football club. Other clubs within Narvik Munincipality include SK Hardhaus, Fagernes IL, Beisfjord IL, Ballangen FK, and Bjerkvik IF.

Narvik is home to the town's ice hockey team, Narvik Hockey, which played in the 2024/25 EliteHockey Ligaen season, Norway's highest tier of ice hockey.

== Transportation ==
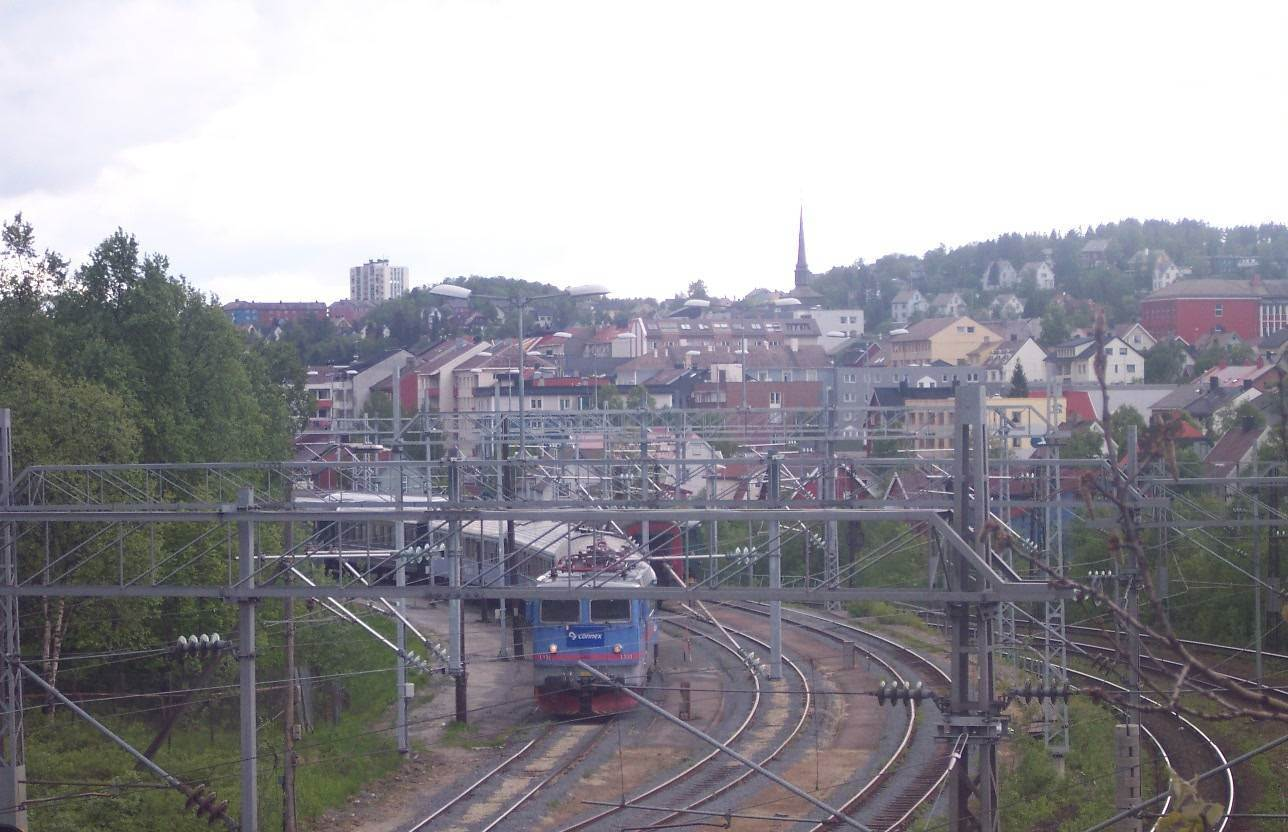
The railway in Narvik

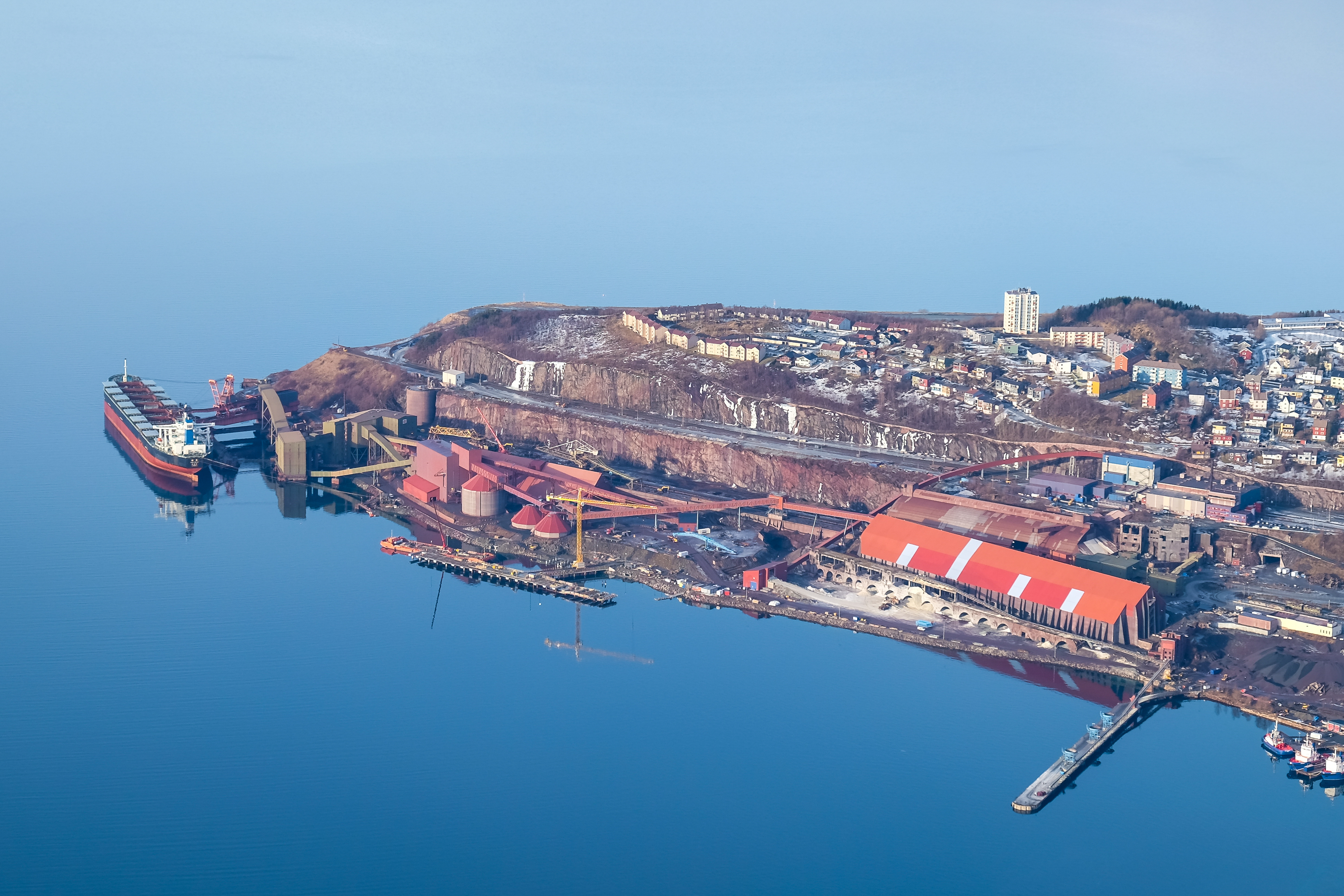
The harbour in Narvik, Norway where a ship is loaded with iron ore.

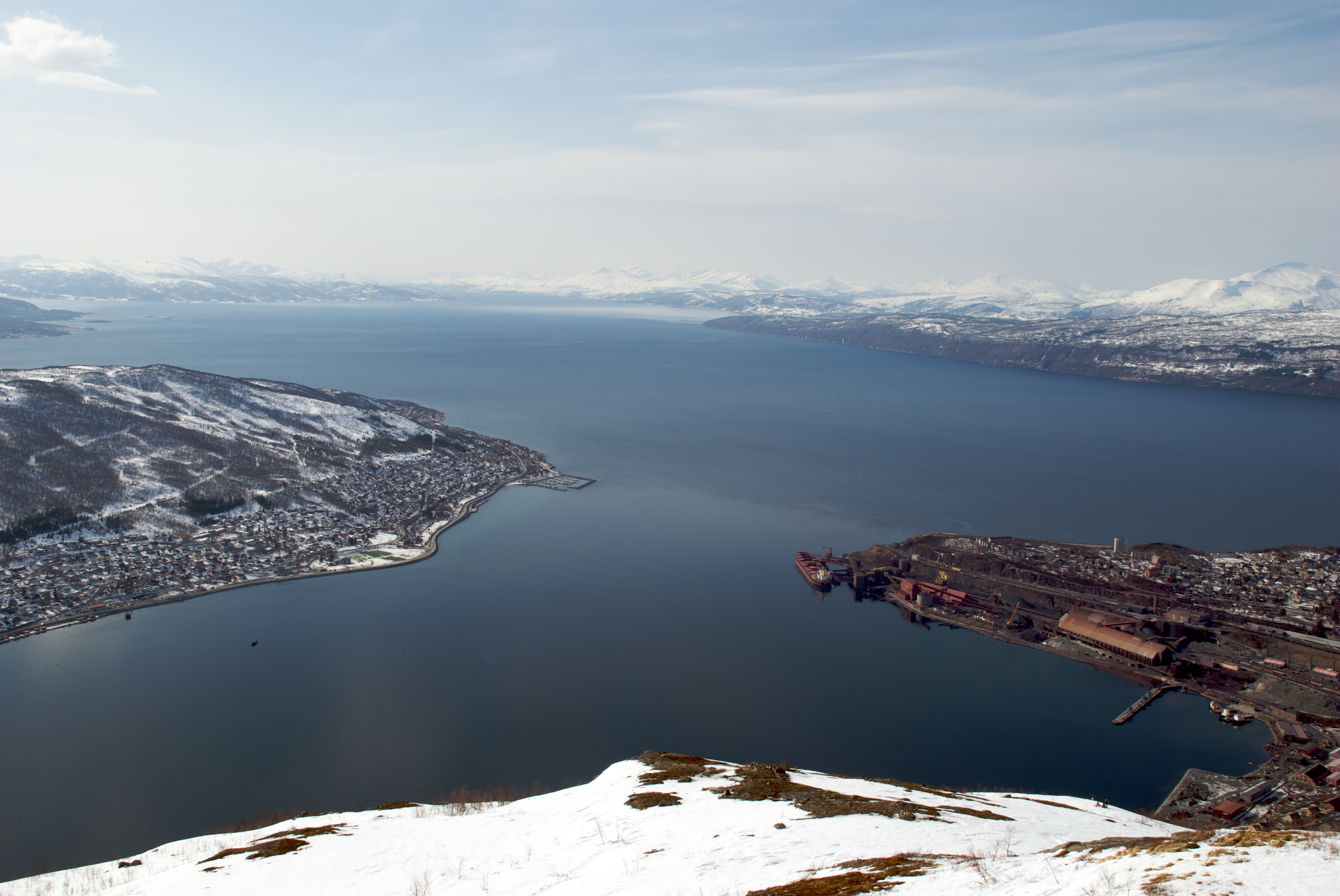
View from Fagernes mountain overlooking Narvik harbour and Ofotfjord, April 2009.

=== Port ===
The port of Narvik is ice-free and well protected from the weather. The port consists of three waterfront sections: LKAB bulk port, central port area with piers and deep-water harbor at Fagernes with intermodal facilities. Approximately 16,000,000 tonnes (16,000,000 long tons; 18,000,000 short tons) of cargo are annually shipped from the ports of Narvik. By 2015, the port had handled 1.1 billion tonnes of ore. Most of this iron ore. In 2015, the port installed a pier with 18 suction cups to moor ships, expected to save 40 minutes of mooring time. Each cup is 2 by 2 metres (6 ft 7 in × 6 ft 7 in).

Port authorities have initiated an expansion of the container area of approximately 45,000 square metres (11 acres), which is more than twice what Norway's largest terminal in Oslo today handles. In 2005, the port of Narvik got status as Motorways of the Sea in the EU-system. In Norway, Oslo is the only city which has this status in addition to the town of Narvik.

=== Rail ===
A present and historical key to land transportation to Narvik is the Ofoten Line railway from northern Sweden across the mountains to this port town. Goods like iron ore shipped via this railroad make Narvik an important seaport. The railway has stops at Bjørnfjell Station, Katterat Station, Søsterbekk Station, and Narvik Station.

Because of the extreme terrain there, there are no railways northwards from Narvik or south to Bodø, Norway, which is at the northern end of the rest of Norway's rail network. However, it is possible to reach Narvik by way of an approximately twenty-hour 1,540-kilometre (960 mi) train journey through the Swedish rail system from Stockholm using the Iron Ore Line.

The activity related to the railway and large port facilities are still important in Narvik, and goods to and from North Norway, Sweden, and Finland are often distributed via Narvik. In the proposed project called the "Northern East West Freight Corridor" portion of the Eurasian Land Bridge, there are plans for using Narvik as a port for goods from East Asia bound for eastern North America. The reason is that the railway and ocean distances using this route are shorter than through central Europe to Western European ports.

=== Road ===
European route E6 crosses through the town using three bridges: Skjomen Bridge, Beisfjord Bridge and Hålogaland Bridge. There is also the Rombak Bridge used for E6 until 2018. There are road connections from Narvik across the mountains eastwards to Abisko and Kiruna, Sweden (via European route E10).

Interestingly, one Narvik citizen lets other citizens use his Tesla cars at will to drive around the town.

=== Air ===
Narvik is served by Harstad/Narvik Airport, Evenes which is located 57 kilometres (35 mi) by road from Narvik and has regular flights to Oslo, Trondheim, Bodø, Tromsø and Andenes.

== See also ==
- List of towns and cities in Norway
