= Beis Fjord =

Fjord in Narvik, Norway

Beis Fjord (English); Beisfjorden (Norwegian); Ušmá (Northern Sami)
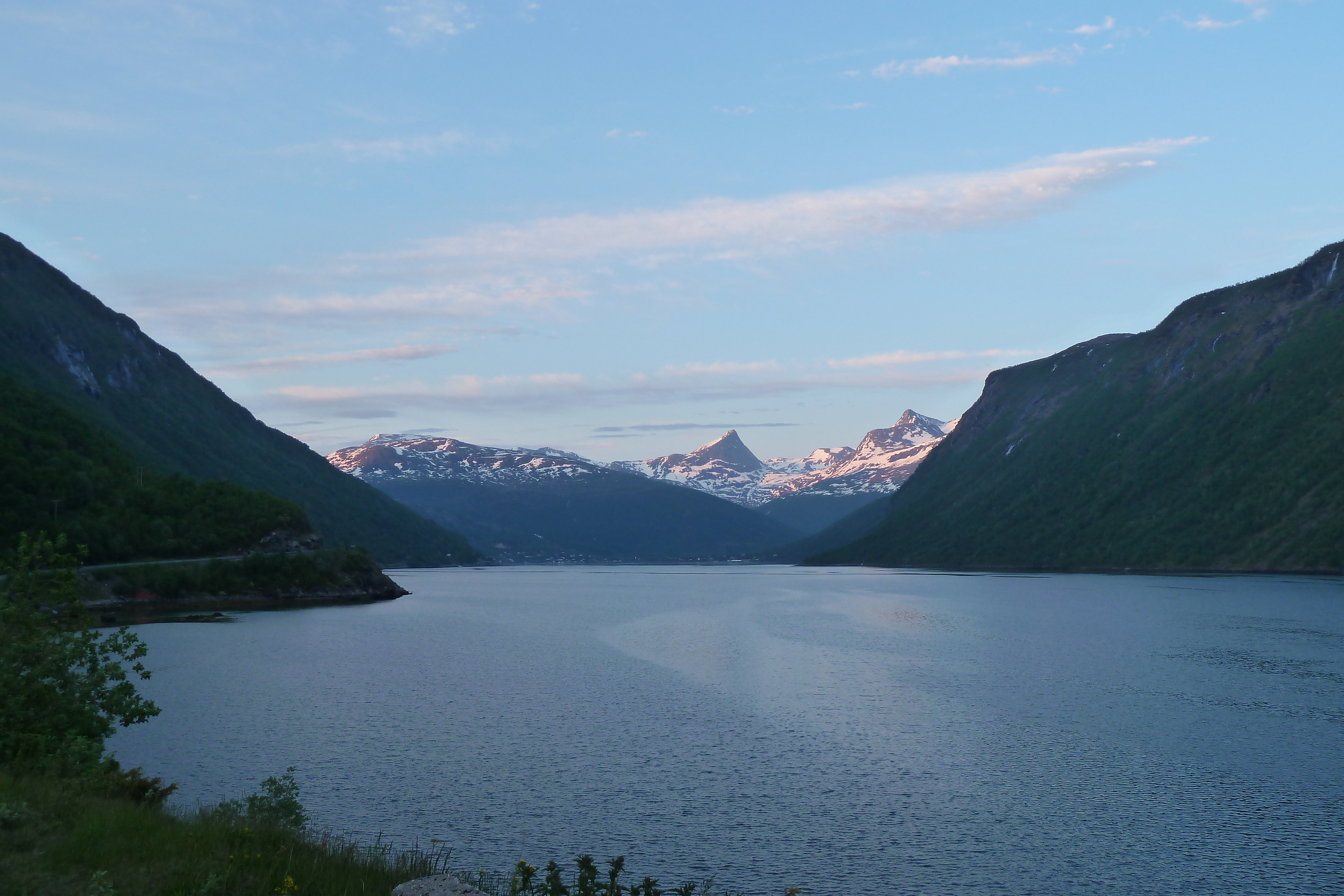
- View of the fjord
- Interactive map of the fjord
- Location: Nordland county, Norway
- Coordinates: 68.39384°N 17.49633°E
- Type: Fjord
- Basin countries: Norway
- Max. length: 11.5 kilometres (7.1 mi)
- Max. width: 1 to 2 kilometres (0.62 to 1.24 mi)
- Max. depth: 44 metres (144 ft)
- Settlements: Ankenesstranda, Beisfjord, Narvik

Beis Fjord (English), Beisfjorden (Norwegian), or Ušmá (Northern Sami) is a fjord in Narvik Municipality in Nordland county, Norway. It is a fjord arm that branches off of the main Ofotfjorden, on the south side of the town of Narvik. The Beisfjord Bridge on the European route E06 highway crosses the fjord between Ankenesstranda and Narvik. The village of Beisfjord is located at the end of the 11.5-kilometre (7.1 mi) long fjord. The maximum depth of the fjord reaches 44 metres (144 ft) below sea level.

== History ==
A temporary bridge was set up over the fjord in July 1943 and a ferry connection was set up between Fagernes and Ankenesstranda.

== See also ==
- List of Norwegian fjords
