= Bjørnfjell Chapel =

Church in Nordland, Norway

- Bjørnfjell kapell Bjørnfjell sportskapell
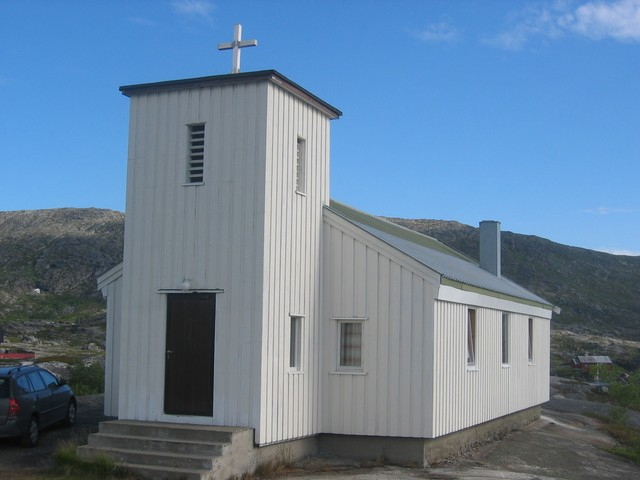
- View of the chapel
- Bjørnfjell Chapel
- 68.4352593°N 18.0683188°E
- Location: Narvik Municipality, Nordland
- Country: Norway
- Denomination: Church of Norway
- Churchmanship: Evangelical Lutheran

History
- Status: Chapel
- Founded: 1952
- Consecrated: 1952

Architecture
- Functional status: Active
- Architect: Bjarne Romsloe
- Architectural type: Long church
- Completed: 1952 (74 years ago)

Specifications
- Materials: Wood

Administration
- Diocese: Sør-Hålogaland
- Deanery: Ofoten prosti
- Parish: Bjerkvik
- Norwegian Cultural Heritage Site
- Type: Church
- Status: Not protected
- ID: 83908

Bjørnfjell Chapel (Norwegian: Bjørnfjell kapell or Bjørnefjell sportskapell) is a chapel of the Church of Norway in Narvik Municipality in Nordland county, Norway. It is located in the rural village of Bjørnfjell, just west of the border with Sweden. It is an annex chapel in the Bjerkvik parish which is part of the Ofoten prosti (deanery) in the Diocese of Sør-Hålogaland. The white, wooden chapel was built in a long church style in 1952 using plans drawn up by the architect Bjarne Romsloe. The chapel is located in a rural area that is populated with vacation cabins that are popular with the residents of the town of Narvik.

== Media gallery ==
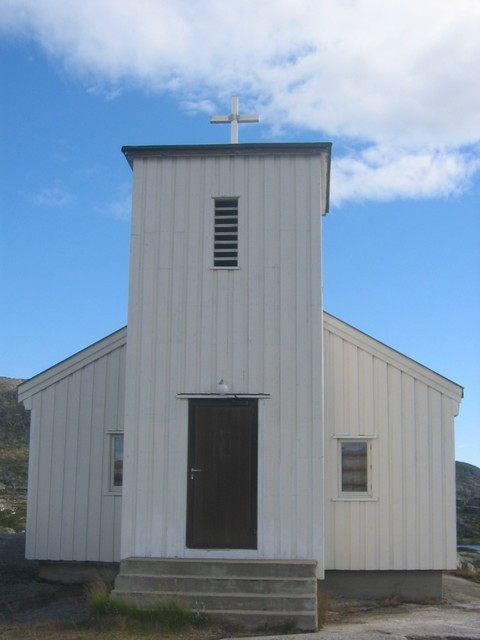

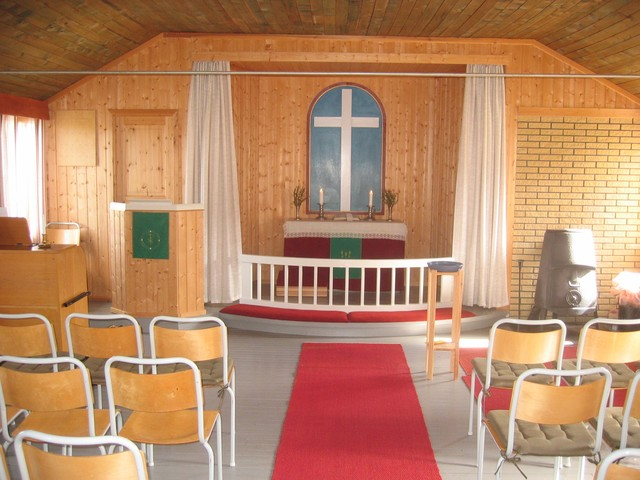

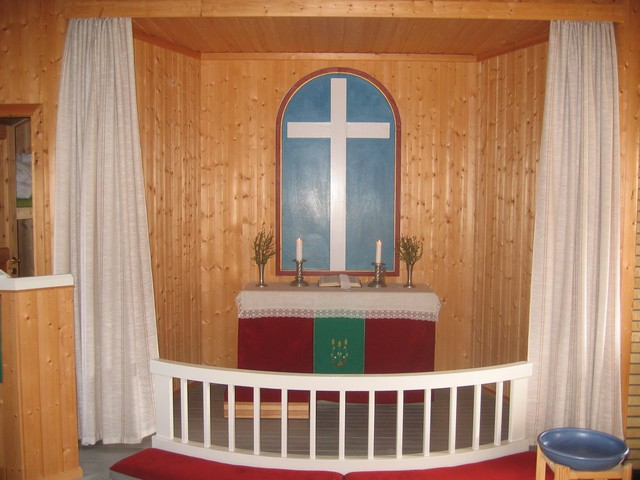

== See also ==
- List of churches in Sør-Hålogaland
