= Riksgränsen =

Ski resort in Lappland, Sweden

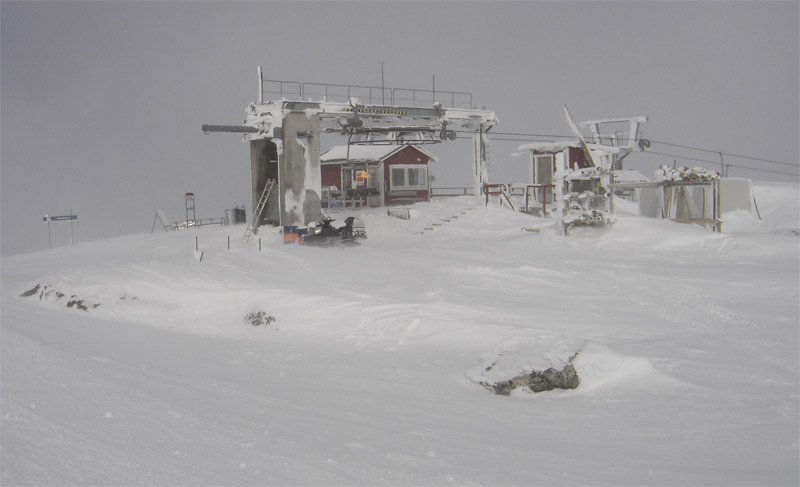
- Lift in Riksgränsen

- Location within Norrbotten Location within Sweden
- Coordinates: 68°25′40″N 18°07′20″E
- Vertical: 410 m (1,350 ft)
- Top elevation: 909 m (2,982 ft)
- Base elevation: 520 m (1,710 ft)
- Trails: 28
- Total length: 15 km (9.3 mi)
- Lift system: 6
- Lift capacity: 7400 passengers/hr
- Snowmaking: no
- Night skiing: Selected days (under midnight sun)

Riksgränsen (Swedish for 'National Border'; Norwegian: Riksgrensen) is a Swedish ski resort located at the northwest edge of Kiruna Municipality in Lappland, next to the Norwegian border. It is the most northerly ski resort in the world, being roughly 200 kilometres (120 mi) north of the Arctic Circle; the skiing season is from February to June, and from the end of May the lifts operate under the midnight sun. One of the pistes crosses the border to Norway and back to Sweden, where there is no border control due to Schengen Area policies.

Riksgränsen is a popular location for the winter testing of pre-production cars by various European manufacturers. Photo-snipers are prevalent, attempting to get the first spy-shots of new models, though their activities are frowned upon by local hoteliers who value the custom of the manufacturers. The same manufacturers frequently use the location for winter launches, bringing journalists from across the world to drive the new cars on snow-covered roads and on courses specially prepared on frozen lakes.

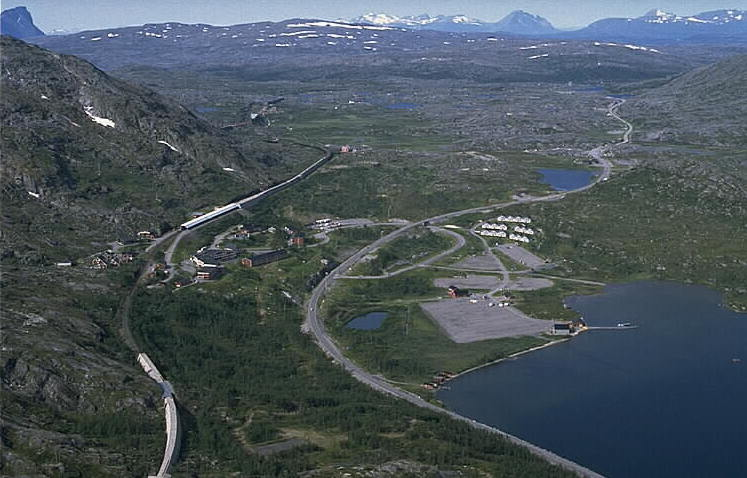
Riksgränsen, August 1994

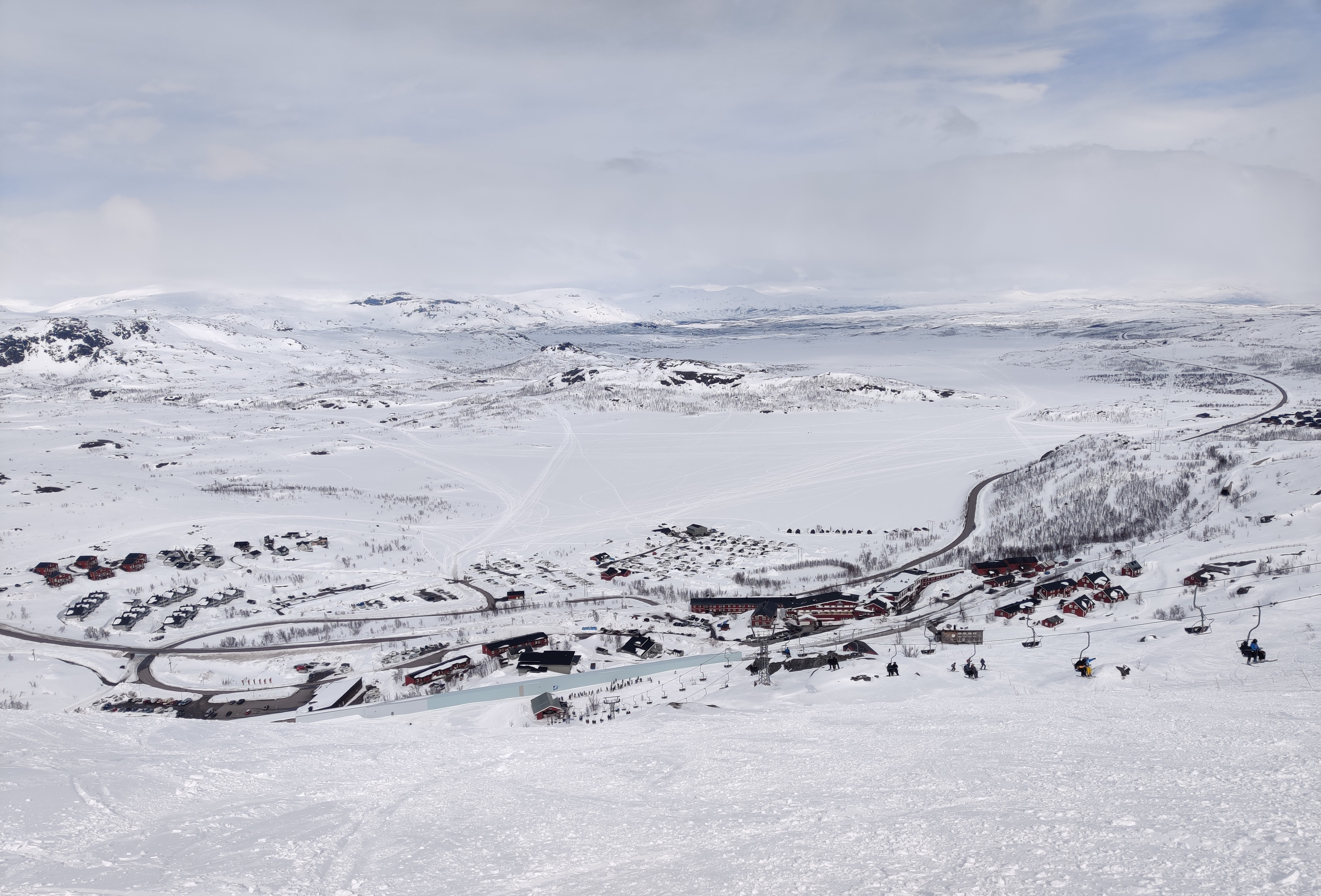
Riksgränsen, May 2020

== History ==
The village was founded around 1900 in connection with the construction of the railway, whose traffic began 1902. Due to railway politics and limited range for steam locomotives, trains changed locomotives and crew and a roundhouse for locomotives was built. Later, after electrification 1923, this roundhouse was removed and locomotives went all the way to Narvik. Tourism picked up in the 1930:s. The first ski lift was built 1952.

== Climate ==
Although the subarctic climate (Koppen: Dfc) of the region is very cold, it has considerably milder winters than normally expected for an inland northerly area, due to its proximity to the warm North Atlantic Current. Summers do remain cool in spite of the midnight sun due to similar maritime effects. With prevailing low-pressure systems taking precedence, the climate is snowy and cloudy. The deep snow cover and the time it takes for thawing prolongs the skiing season to the midnight sun window. The snow depth can be above 200 centimetres (6.6 ft) in unshovelled areas during spring. The snow depth charts have sometimes ended during late May when the pack has been shrinking, which skews the June readings that likely are a bit higher. In 2020, a 145 centimetres (4.76 ft) snow depth was measured in that month.

Climate data for Katterjåkk, 2002–2020 (extremes since 1901)
Month	Jan	Feb	Mar	Apr	May	Jun	Jul	Aug	Sep	Oct	Nov	Dec	Year
Record high °C (°F)	7.1 (44.8)	6.4 (43.5)	7.0 (44.6)	12.6 (54.7)	23.5 (74.3)	27.8 (82.0)	30.0 (86.0)	28.2 (82.8)	21.8 (71.2)	14.7 (58.5)	10.4 (50.7)	8.5 (47.3)	30.0 (86.0)
Mean maximum °C (°F)	2.8 (37.0)	2.6 (36.7)	3.3 (37.9)	7.4 (45.3)	14.2 (57.6)	20.3 (68.5)	23.6 (74.5)	22.1 (71.8)	16.3 (61.3)	8.9 (48.0)	5.2 (41.4)	3.7 (38.7)	24.5 (76.1)
Mean daily maximum °C (°F)	−7.0 (19.4)	−6.7 (19.9)	−3.9 (25.0)	1.2 (34.2)	6.1 (43.0)	11.8 (53.2)	16.4 (61.5)	14.3 (57.7)	8.9 (48.0)	2.0 (35.6)	−1.8 (28.8)	−4.1 (24.6)	3.1 (37.6)
Daily mean °C (°F)	−10.5 (13.1)	−10.2 (13.6)	−7.3 (18.9)	−2.2 (28.0)	2.9 (37.2)	8.1 (46.6)	12.4 (54.3)	10.7 (51.3)	6.0 (42.8)	−0.5 (31.1)	−4.7 (23.5)	−7.4 (18.7)	−0.2 (31.6)
Mean daily minimum °C (°F)	−14.0 (6.8)	−13.6 (7.5)	−10.7 (12.7)	−5.6 (21.9)	−0.4 (31.3)	4.4 (39.9)	8.3 (46.9)	7.1 (44.8)	3.1 (37.6)	−2.9 (26.8)	−7.5 (18.5)	−10.6 (12.9)	−3.5 (25.6)
Mean minimum °C (°F)	−24.8 (−12.6)	−25.4 (−13.7)	−21.0 (−5.8)	−15.0 (5.0)	−7.5 (18.5)	−0.4 (31.3)	3.6 (38.5)	1.6 (34.9)	−2.8 (27.0)	−11.0 (12.2)	−16.2 (2.8)	−20.9 (−5.6)	−28.0 (−18.4)
Record low °C (°F)	−34.5 (−30.1)	−35.2 (−31.4)	−30.9 (−23.6)	−24.0 (−11.2)	−15.1 (4.8)	−9.0 (15.8)	−0.5 (31.1)	−3.0 (26.6)	−8.8 (16.2)	−20.0 (−4.0)	−25.0 (−13.0)	−33.0 (−27.4)	−35.2 (−31.4)
Average precipitation mm (inches)	79.5 (3.13)	68.0 (2.68)	73.3 (2.89)	45.1 (1.78)	47.4 (1.87)	71.7 (2.82)	82.2 (3.24)	73.6 (2.90)	105.6 (4.16)	80.8 (3.18)	65.4 (2.57)	83.1 (3.27)	875.7 (34.49)
Average extreme snow depth cm (inches)	104 (41)	131 (52)	155 (61)	157 (62)	130 (51)	36 (14)	0 (0)	0 (0)	5 (2.0)	24 (9.4)	43 (17)	78 (31)	163 (64)
Mean monthly sunshine hours	0	22	88	153	201	201	217	153	80	42	1	0	1,158
