= Luleå Central Station =

Railway station in Luleå, Sweden

Luleå C
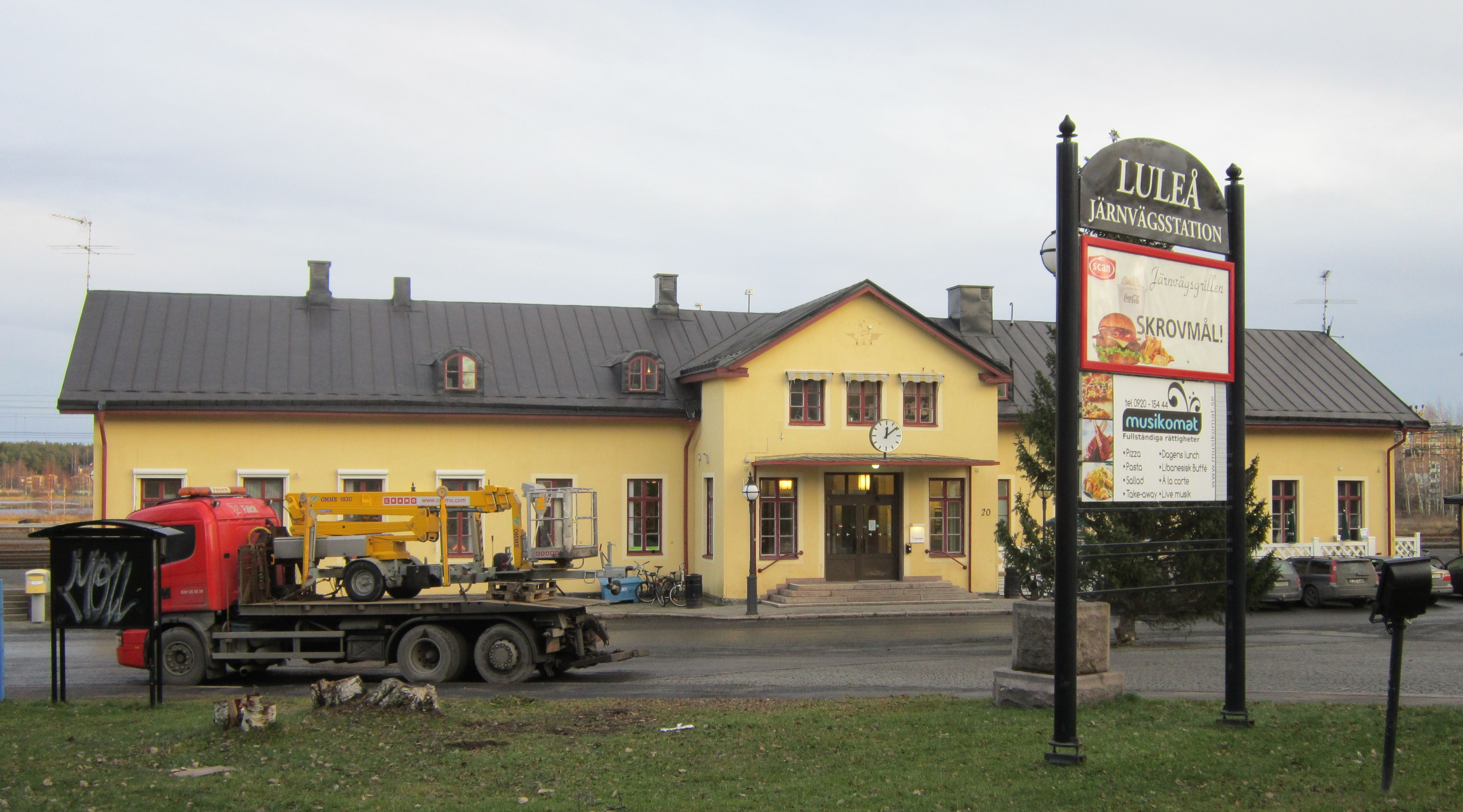

General information
- Location: Prästgatan 20; 972 34 Luleå; Sweden
- Coordinates: 65°35′03″N 22°09′54″E
- Owner: Jernhusen (station infrastructure); Trafikverket (rail infrastructure)
- Operator: Norrtåg
- Line: Luleå-Narvik
- Platforms: 2
- Tracks: 3

History
- Opened: 1884; 142 years ago

Services
Preceding station	Norrtåg	Following station
Notviken towards Kiruna	Iron Ore Line	Terminus
Notviken towards Haparanda	Haparanda Line	Terminus
Terminus	Main Line Through Upper Norrland	Notviken towards Umeå Ö
Location

Luleå Central Station (Swedish: Luleå centralstation) or Luleå C is a railway station located on the Main Line Through Upper Norrland in Luleå, Sweden. The station is owned by Jernhusen and is the terminal of the line.

The station is located at the eastern end of Stationsgatan, in the eastern part of the city center. The bus terminal for Länstrafiken i Norrbotten is located 300 metres (980 ft) northwest of the station. There are also three hotels within walking distance of the station.

Luleå C is served by two daily trains along the Iron Ore Line to Kiruna Central Station and onwards along the Ofoten Line to Narvik Station in Norway. In addition, there is a daily service to Umeå Central Station and two daily services to Stockholm Central Station along the Main Line Through Upper Norrland. Trains are operated by SJ.

The station has been proposed as the northern terminal station of the planned North Bothnia Line, which would run southwards and connect to the high-speed Bothnia Line in Umeå. The line would allow direct high-speed services to Stockholm, as well as regional services to Robertsfors, Skellefteå and Piteå and existing stations on the Bothnia Line. The plans for Luleå C involve moving the freight terminal out of the city center, and expanding the passenger station to allow for increased traffic. This includes new facilities for city and regional buses, while parts to the east of the station are planned to be redeveloped into housing and offices. Luleå is planned to have two other station in addition, one serving Luleå University of Technology and one serving Luleå Airport.
