= Narvik Station =

Railway station in Narvik, Norway

Narvik
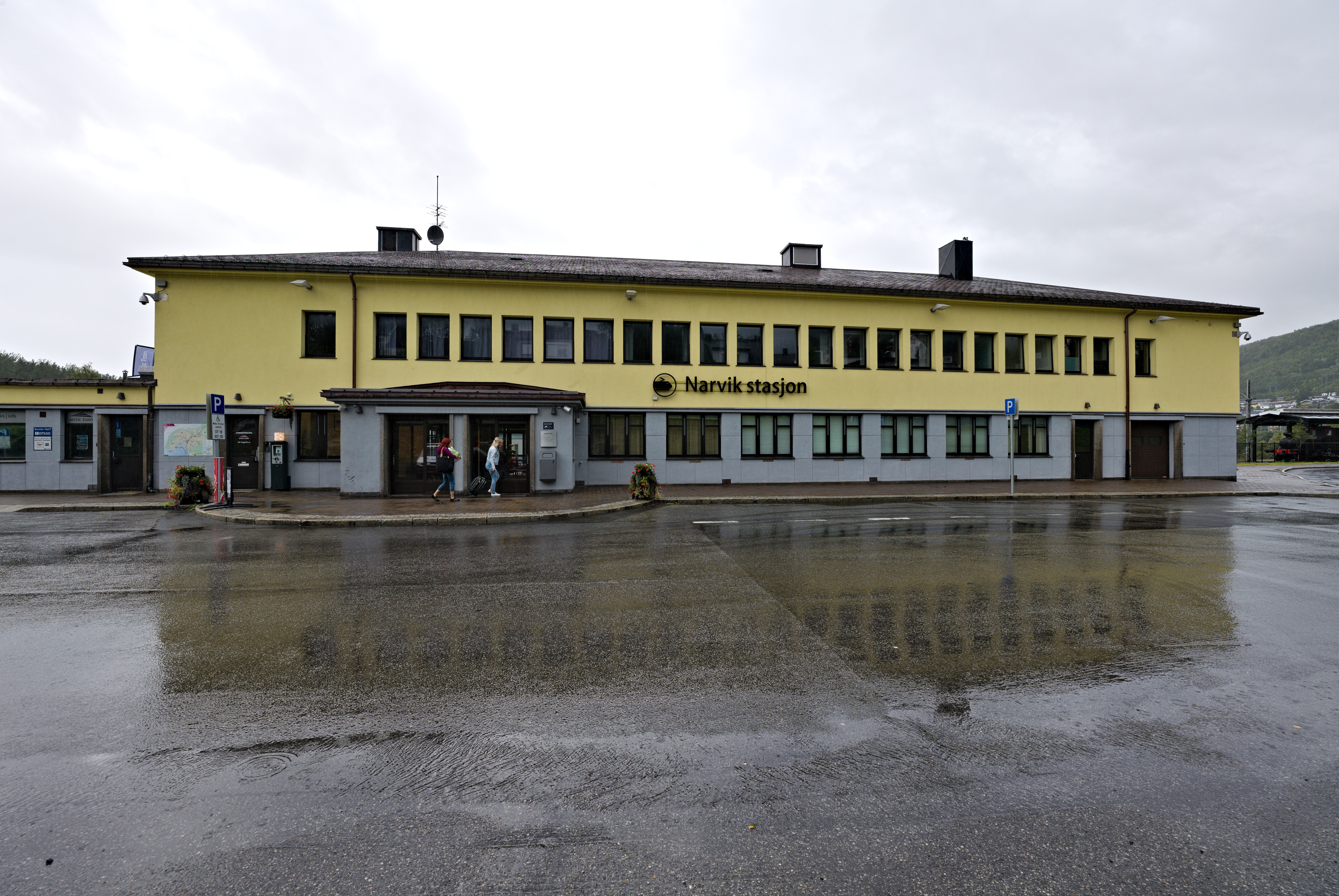
- Narvik station in 2022

General information
- Location: Narvik Municipality, Nordland county Norway
- Coordinates: 68°26′30″N 17°26′30″E
- Elevation: 46.6 metres (153 ft)
- Owner: Bane NOR
- Operator: SJ AB
- Line: Ofoten Line
- Platforms: 2

Other information
- Station code: NK

History
- Opened: 1902
- Rebuilt: 1951
Location
- Location within Nordland Location within Norway

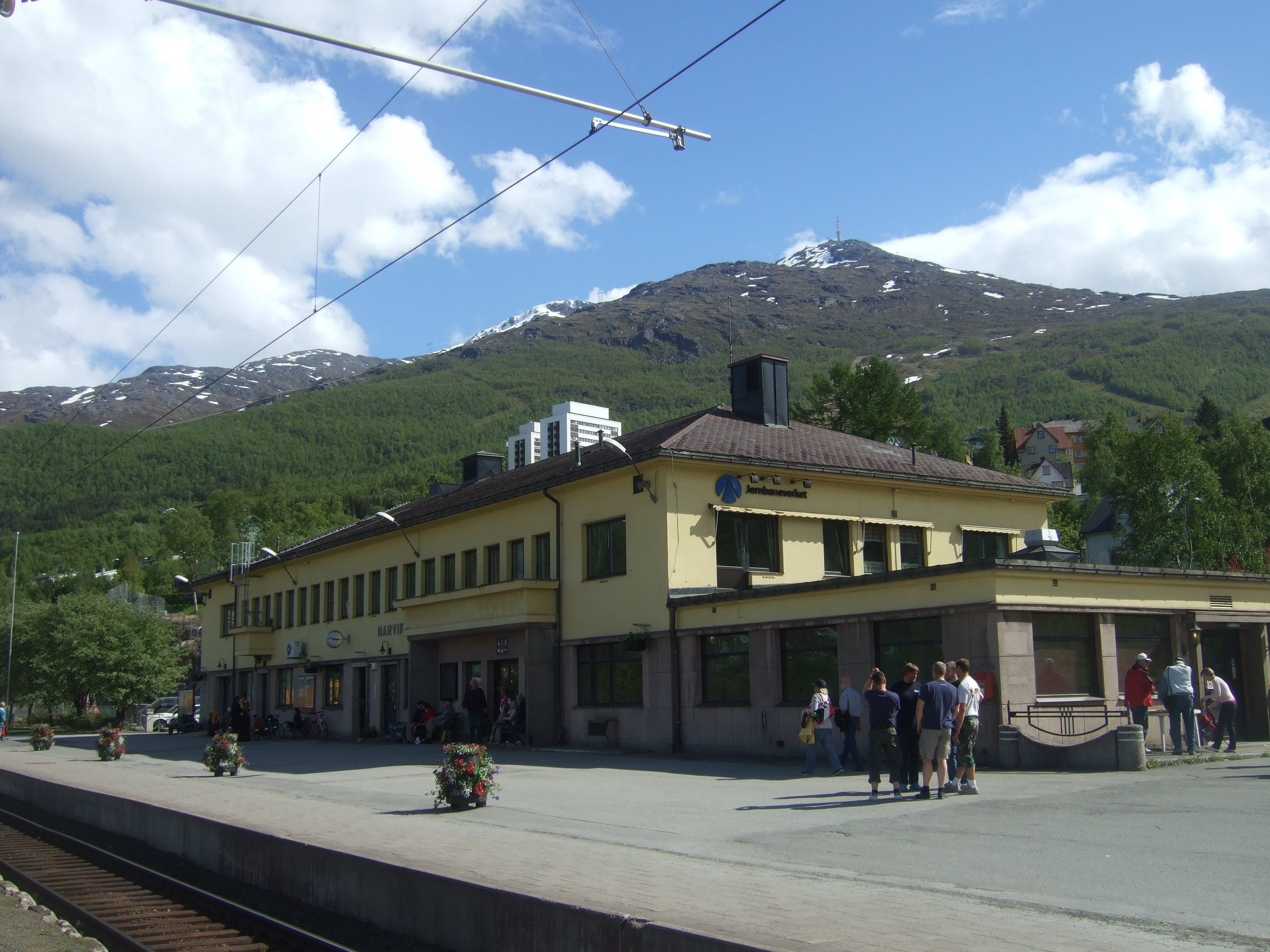
Narvik Station

Narvik is a railway station located in Narvik Municipality in Nordland, Norway on the Ofoten Line. The station is located about 3.7 kilometres (2.3 mi) from the end of the line at the Port of Narvik.

It is served by a daily passenger train to Luleå, via Kiruna and Boden, all these destinations are in Sweden. Since December 2024, this passenger services is operated by SJ, a state-owned passenger train operator in Sweden.

Since 2020 a local summer seasonal passenger service, called 'The Arctic Train' has been operated between Narvik and Bjørnfjell and back. Tickets are sold to general public but cruise ship passengers are a target group.

The station is the northernmost station in the Schengen Area and the northernmost standard-gauge railway station in the world.

Until April 2026, it was the northern terminus for one of Europe's most celebrated night trains, the Norrlandståget which leaves Stockholm around six every afternoon, reaches Lappmarken by early the following morning, and then traverses the mountains that delimit the modern frontier between Sweden and Norway to reach the Ofotfjord, on the south shore of which lies the port of Narvik, where it arrives early afternoon. It is a journey which has been praised as "surely one of the most engaging adventures by train in all Europe".

Onward journey is by bus only. Narvik is a bus hub, the bus station is located about 1.1 kilometres (0.68 mi) south-west of the railway station at Sleggesvingen (68°26′15″N 17°25′20″E), popular routes include:

- South to Fauske, Bodø and the Norwegian rail network
- West to Svolvær/Lofoten, Sortland/Vesterålen and Harstad.
- North to Tromsø, with connections to Finnsnes and Senja.

== History ==
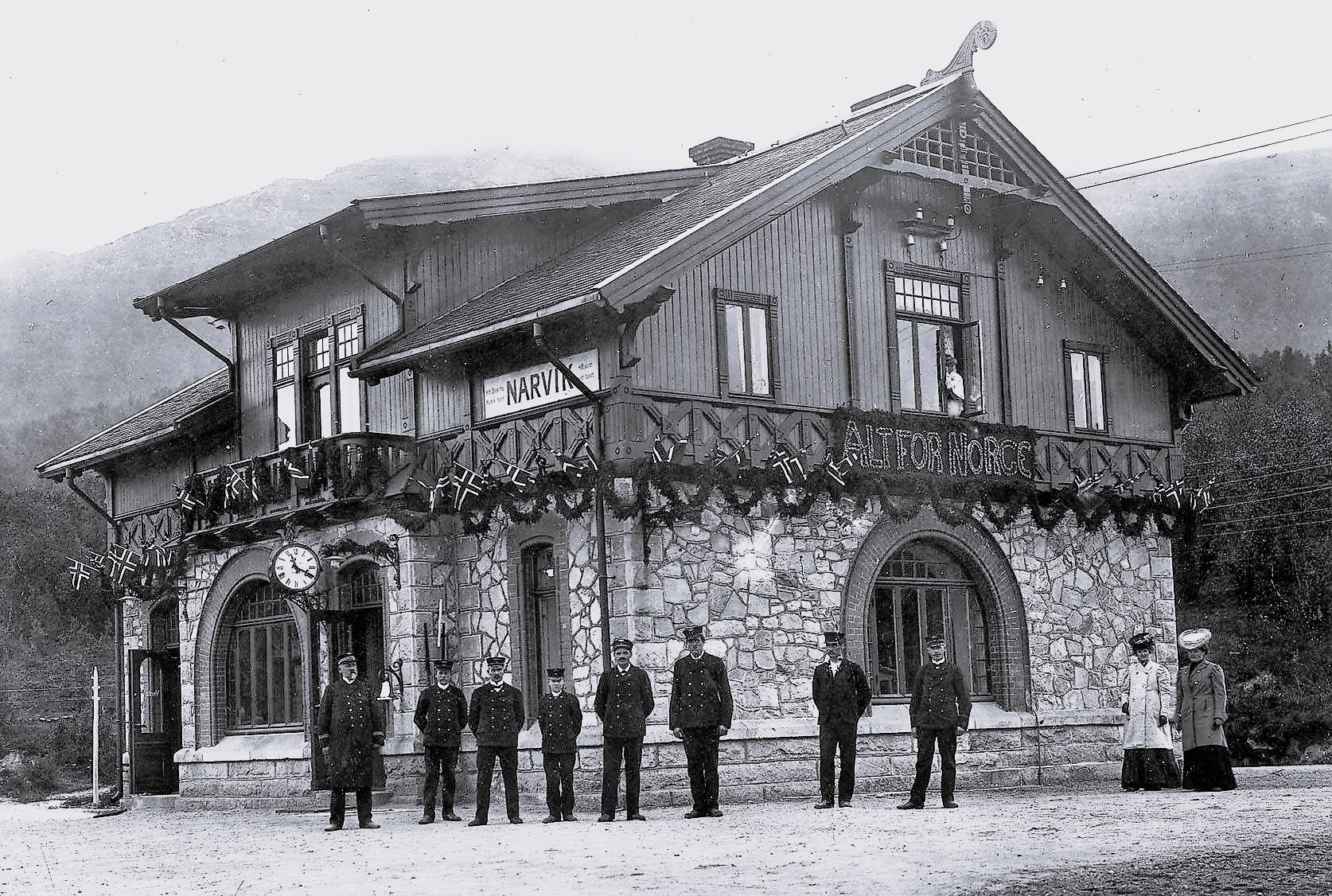
Original 1902 built station at the official opening of the line in 1903

Prior to the line opening the station was known as Taraldsvik station, it was constructed in 1900/1901. The station opened for passengers in 1902 along with Ofoten Line, to the Swedish border, and its continuation, the Iron Ore Line, in Sweden.

The station was officially opened and renamed as Narvik by King Oscar II on 14 July 1903.

The building was designed by Paul Armin Due, the ground floor was built of cut granite and fitted with arched windows, while the first floor was constructed of wood in the Swiss style.

In 1914 the station had one long-distance sleeper service to and from Boden Central Station. By 1939 there were two sleeper services that ran through to Stockholm.

The station was badly damaged during World War II and was rebuilt afterwards, reopening in 1951. The new station was described as "small, modern and convenient".

Preceding station	Express trains	Following station
Terminus	F8	Rombak towards Luleå C or Stockholm C

== See also ==
- Night trains of Norway
- Night trains of Sweden

== Bibliography ==
- Bradshaw, George (1972) [1914]. Bradshaw's August 1914 continental guide. David & Charles Reprints. ISBN 0 7153 5509 0. OCLC 707182588.
- Cook's continental timetable : a new edition of the August 1939 issue of Cook's continental timetable with enlarged type and introduction by J.H. Price. Newton Abbot: David & Charles. 1987 [1939]. OCLC 988081599.
- Owen, Roy (1996). Norwegian railways : from Stephenson to high speed. Hitchin: Balholm Press. ISBN 0-9528069-0-8. OCLC 43127416.
- Watts, C.E.N. (June 1953). "Railway through Lapland". Railway Magazine. Vol. 99, no. 626. pp. 380–384.
- Narvik station information at Bane Nor (in Norwegian)
- Narvik station information at the Norwegian Railway Club's station database (in Norwegian)
