= Takida discography =

- Studio albums: 9
- Extended plays: 5
- Compilation albums: 1
- Singles: 16
- Music videos: 8

This is the discography documenting albums and singles released by Takida.

== Albums ==
Year	Title	Chart positions				Certifications
Year	Title	SWE	AUT	GER	SWI	Certifications
2006	...Make You Breathe: 1st studio album; Released: May 29, 2006	7	—	—	—	
2007	Bury the Lies ^{1}: 2nd studio album; 1st international release; Released: May 16, 2007	1	—	—	—	GLF: Platinum
2009	The Darker Instinct: 3rd studio album; Released: September 2, 2009	1	—	—	—	GLF: 2× Platinum
2011	The Burning Heart: 4th studio album; Released: July 27, 2011	1	—	—	—	GLF: 2× Platinum
2012	A Lesson Learned – The Best Of: 5th studio album; Released: December 2012	2	—	—	—	GLF: Gold
2014	All Turns Red: 6th studio album; Released: March 2014	1	—	—	—	GLF: Gold
2016	A Perfect World: 7th studio album; Released: 22 April 2016	1	—	—	—	GLF: Gold
2019	Sju: 8th studio album; Released: 7 June 2019	5	—	29	—	GLF: Gold
2020	Demo Days: 9th studio album; Released: 17 April 2020	37	—	—	—	
2021	Falling from Fame: 9th studio album; Released: 27 August 2021	6	—	17	—	
2024	The Agony Flame: 10th studio album; Released: 9 February 2024	12	64	8	57	
"—" denotes the album failed to chart or not released

^{1} First album released outside of Scandinavia

== EPs and other releases ==
- Old (2000)
- T2 (2000)
- tAKiDA (2001)
- Gohei (2003)
- Thorns (2004)

== Singles ==
Year	Single	Chart positions	Certifications	Album
Year	Single	SWE	Certifications	Album
2006	"Losing"	2		...Make You Breathe
2006	"Jaded"	—		...Make You Breathe
2006	"Reason to Cry"	—		...Make You Breathe
2007	"Halo"	50		Bury the Lies
2007	"Curly Sue"	1	GLF: Platinum	Bury the Lies
2008	"The Dread"	—		Bury the Lies
2008	"Handlake Village"	16		Bury the Lies
2009	"As You Die"	20		The Darker Instinct
2009	"The Things We Owe"	3	GLF: Gold	The Darker Instinct
2010	"Never Alone Always Alone"	12	GLF: Platinum	The Darker Instinct
2010	"Deadlock"	—		The Darker Instinct
2011	"Was It I?"	—	GLF: Gold	The Burning Heart
2011	"Haven Stay"	—	GLF: Platinum	The Burning Heart
2011	"You Learn"	5	GLF: 4× Platinum	The Burning Heart
2012	"Fire Away"	—		The Burning Heart
2012	"Swallow (Until You're Gone)"	—	GLF: Platinum	A Lesson Learned – The Best Of
2016	"Better"	73	GLF: Platinum	A Perfect World
2016	"Don't Wait Up"	— (Note: "Don't Wait Up" did not enter the Swedish Singles Chart, but peaked at number 10 on the Swedish Heatseeker chart.)		A Perfect World
2018	"Master"	— (Note: "Master" did not enter the Swedish Singellista Chart, but peaked at number three on the Swedish Heatseeker Chart.)	GLF: Platinum	Sju
"—" denotes the single failed to chart or not released

== Other certified songs ==
Year	Title	Certifications	Album
2014	"To Have and to Hold"	GLF: Gold	All Turns Red
2016	"Flowerchild (The Beauty of Stray)"	GLF: Gold	A Perfect World

== Other appearances ==
Year	Title	Length	Album
2000	"It's a Sin"	4:01	Played Out Vol. 1
2002	"One of a Kind"	4:46	Played Out Vol. 2
2009	"Curly Sue"	3:53	Singstar Svenska Stjärnor

== Music videos ==
Year	Song	Album
2006	"Losing"	...Make You Breathe
2007	"Curly Sue"	...Bury the Lies
2008	"Handlake Village"	...Bury the Lies
2009	"As You Die"	The Darker Instinct
2009	"The Things We Owe"	The Darker Instinct
2011	"Was It I?"	The Burning Heart
2011	"Haven Stay"	The Burning Heart
2011	"You Learn"	The Burning Heart
