= Östersund Central Station =

Railway station in Östersund, Sweden

Östersund C
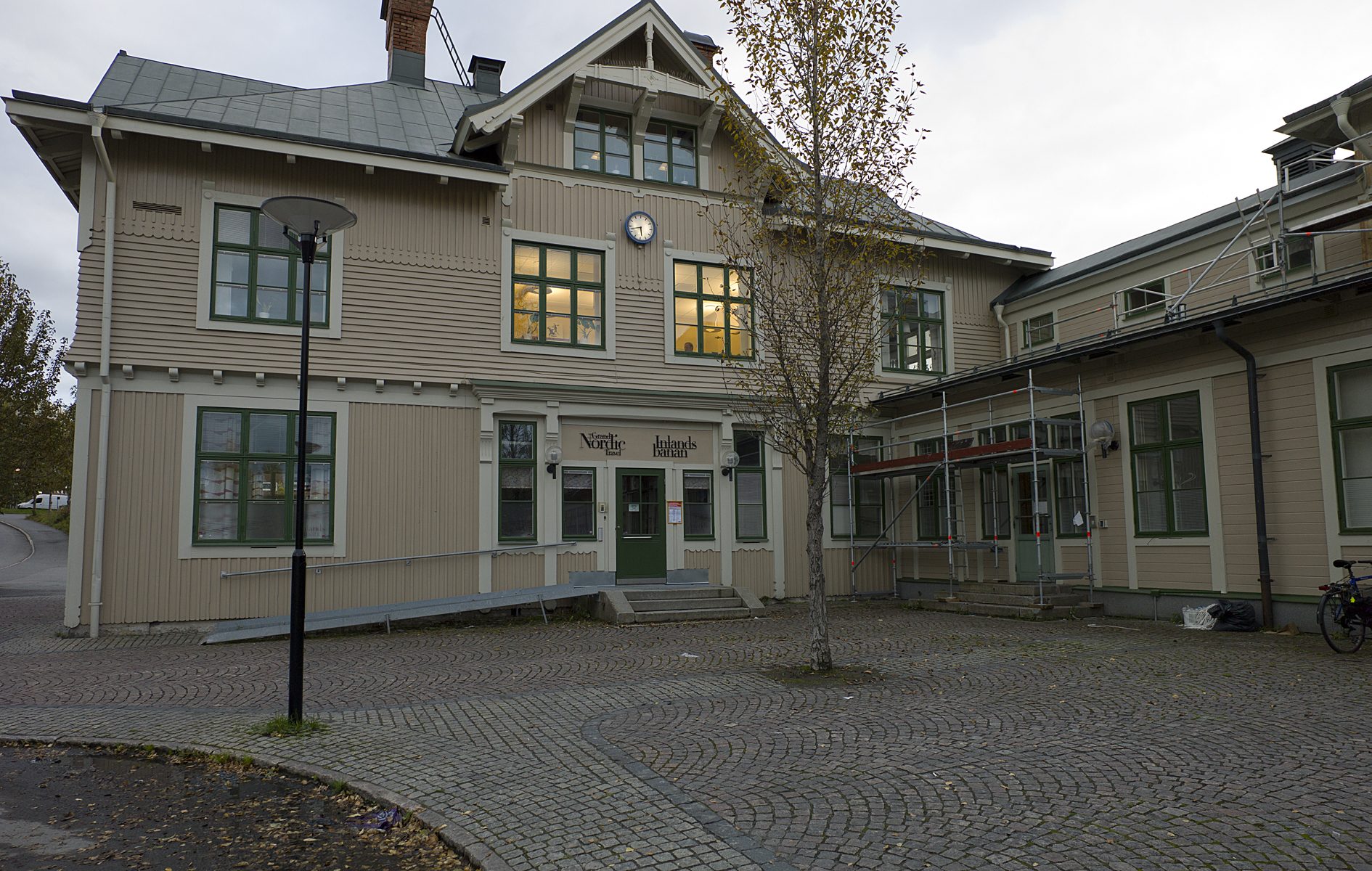
- Östersund Central Railway Station

General information
- Location: Östersund Municipality; Sweden
- Coordinates: 63.17034°N 14.63773°E
- Elevation: 297 m (974 ft)
- Owner: Jernhusen (station infrastructure); Trafikverket (rail infrastructure)
- Line: Sundsvall-Storlien (-Trondheim)
- Platforms: 2
- Tracks: 4
- Train operators: SJ

History
- Opened: 1879; 147 years ago

Services
Preceding station	SJ	Following station
Järpen towards Duved	Northern Main Line InterCity	Bräcke towards Stockholm C
Terminus	Northern Main Line X2000	Bräcke towards Stockholm C
Preceding station	Long distance trains	Following station
Undersåker towards Storlien	Snälltåget	Uppsala C towards Malmö C
Preceding station	Norrtåg	Following station
Östersund V towards Storlien	Central Line	Brunflo towards Sundsvall C
Preceding station	Regional trains	Following station
Östersund V towards Gällivare	Inlandsbanan, seasonal	Brunflo towards Mora C
Location

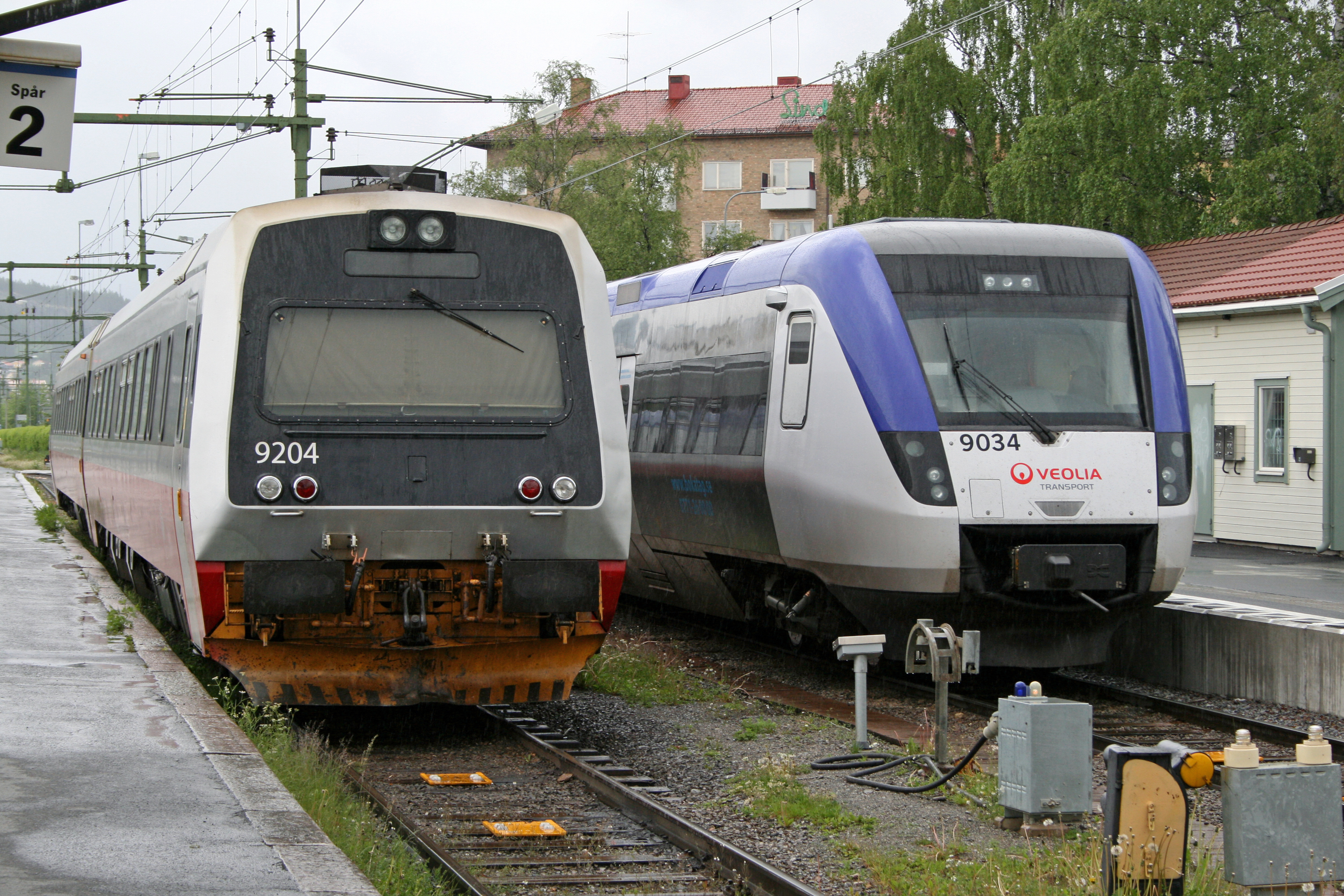
NSB Class 92 and Veolia Regina trains at Östersund Central Station

Östersund Central Station (Swedish: Östersund centralstation) or Östersund C is the main railway station serving Östersund, Sweden. It is located on the Middle Line (Mittbananand) and the Inland Line (Inlandsbanan) and is served by SJ, Norrtåg, Snälltåget and Inlandsbanan- Trains leave for Stockholm a couple of times per day and once a day by Inlandsbanan to Gällivare (a one-day travel) or to Mora. Norrtåg run regional train services from the station many times per day, west to Åre, Duved or Storlien, or east to Ånge and Sundsvall.

The station building was built in 1879, mainly following the drawings of architect Adolf W. Edelsvärd (1824–1919). The building was constructed entirely in wood. English botanist William Dallimore (1871–1959) visited the station in 1929 and noted that the "best birch panelling" was used.
