= Ånge station =

Railway station in Ånge, Sweden

Ånge
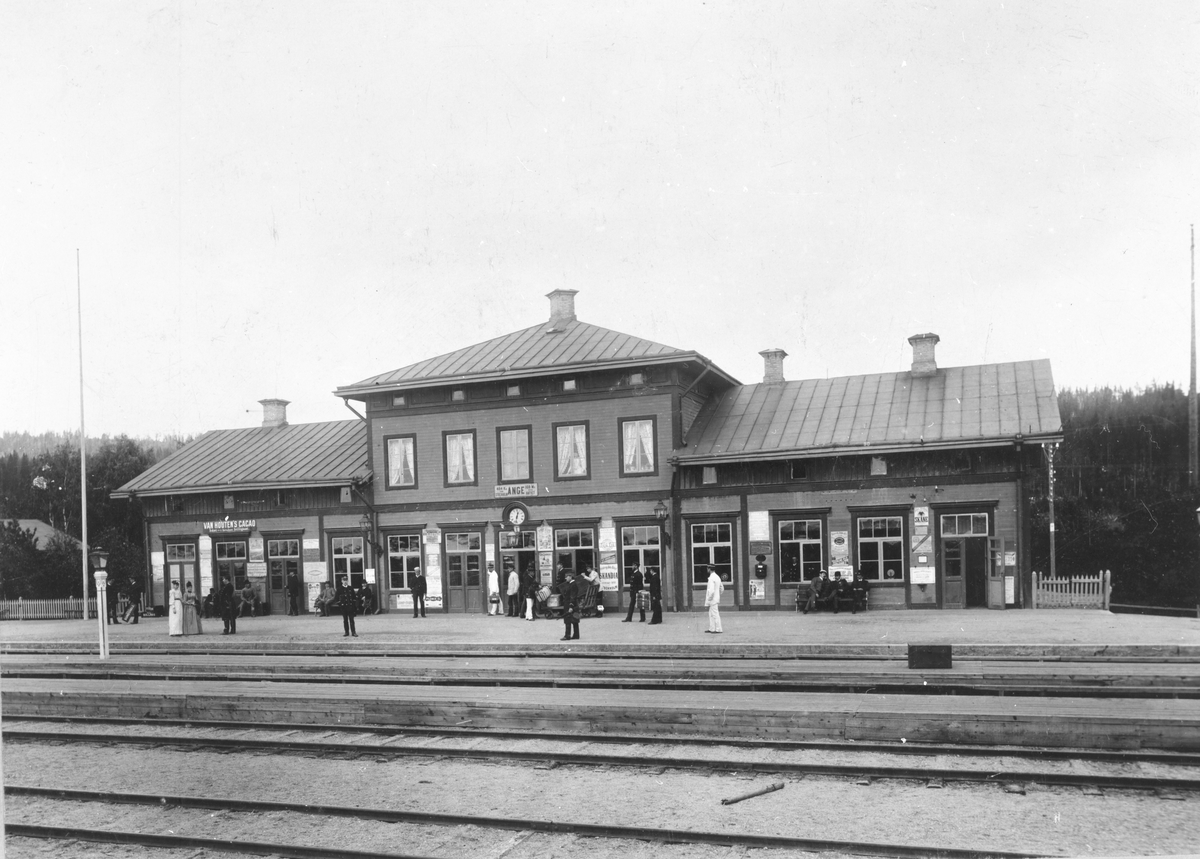

General information
- Location: Ånge, Ånge Municipality; Sweden
- Coordinates: 62°31′23″N 15°39′32″E
- Owner: Jernhusen
- Lines: Central Line; Northern Main Line

History
- Opened: 1878

Services
| Preceding station | SJ | Following station |
|---|---|---|
| Bräcke towards Duved | Central Line InterCity and Night | Sundsvall C towards Stockholm C |
| Bräcke towards Duved | Northern Main Line InterCity | Ljusdal towards Stockholm C |
| Preceding station | Norrtåg | Following station |
| Bräcke towards Storlien | Central Line | Erikslund towards Sundsvall C |
Location

Ånge station (Swedish: Ånge station), is a railway station located at Ånge in Västernorrland County, Sweden.

According to the Swedish National Heritage Board, the train station in Ånge was a model for the Storlien Station by Adolf W. Edelsvärd.

The rail yard at Ånge station is a major freight yard for the Central Region with 26 tracks, electrified for the most part.
