= Admiral Fleming =

Admiral Fleming may refer to:

- Clas Larsson Fleming (1592–1644), Royal Swedish Navy vice admiral
- Erik Fleming (councilor) (1487–1548), Finnish-born Royal Swedish Navy admiral
- Henrik Fleming (1584–1650), Royal Swedish Navy vice admiral
- Klaus Fleming (1535–1597), Finnish-born Royal Swedish Navy admiral
