= Plan Three =

- Origin: Stockholm, Sweden
- Genres: Alternative rock
- Years active: 2000 – present
- Labels: GAIN Music Entertainment (2017-now); Ninetone Records (2009 -2015); Dogmatic (2007-2008)
- Members: Viktor Markowicz; Mathias Garneij; Tommie Hammar; David Clewett; Peter Kjellin; Kristoffer Folin
- Past members: Jacob Lovén; Andreas Henriksson; Mattias Willis; Andreas Malm
- Website: www.planthreeband.com

Plan Three is a band from Stockholm, Sweden, formed in 2000. The band consists of Viktor Markowicz (vocals), Mathias Garneij (guitar), Tommie Hammar (guitar), Peter Kjellin (bass), David Clewett (keyboard) and Kristoffer Folin (drums).

After a couple of years of performing live in Sweden and releasing self produced demos the band got signed by record label Dogmatic in 2007 and released the single "Achilles Heel" (distributed by Universal Music). The same year the band supported Takida on their fall tour in Sweden. In 2008, the band played at the Peace & Love festival in Borlänge, Sweden among other places and at the end of the summer a new single entitled "Triggers" was released. Later in November that year the band supported 3 Doors Down at their show in Stockholm.

In 2009, the band signed with label Ninetone Records and during the summer the band recorded their debut album with producer Patrik Frisk. The album entitled Screaming Our Sins was released in Sweden on November 25 and has subsequently been released.

In the summer of 2010, the band played at Pier Pressure (festival) in Gothenburg on the same stage as bands such as The Sounds, HIM and Thirty Seconds to Mars and also Rammstein and In Flames among others during the Metaltown Festival in the days before.

In 2011, the band released an EP titled "The Signal – Part One" followed by a longer hiatus and in November 2014 the band returned with the release of the single "When Everything Comes To An End". This led to their 2017 release of "Wish I Was Stormborne", their second full-length studio album, which was released on September 29.

Shortly after the release of their second album, the band announced the departure of lead vocalist Jacob and presented their new singer Viktor Markowicz. On January 12, 2018, they released a live studio session EP containing acoustic versions of three of the songs from their latest full-length as well as a cover version of Phil Collins’ "Another Day in Paradise".

In 2019, the band released two singles: "Narcissistic Man" and "Taravana".

== Discography ==
=== Albums ===
- "Achilles Heel" (2007 10 15)
- "Screaming Our Sins" (2009 12 07)
- "Wish I Was Stormborne" (2017 09 28)

=== EP's ===
- "The Signal - Part One" (2011)
- "Live Studio Session EP" (2018)

=== Singles ===
- "Achilles Heel" (2007)
- "Triggers" (2008)
- "Still Broken" (2008)
- "Brush It Off" (2008)
- "Chasing Tornadoes" (2011)
- "When Everything Comes to an End" (2014)
- "Welcome to the Edge" (2017)
- "The Otherside" (2017)
- "Echo" (2017)
- "Narcissistic Man" (2019)
- "Taravana" (2019)
- "Stay" (2022)
