= Losing (Takida song) =

Single by Takida

from the album ...Make You Breathe
- Released: 30 January 2006 (swe)
- Recorded: January – May 2006
- Genre: Rock
- Length: 3:47
- Label: Ninetone Records
- Songwriter(s): Fredrik Pålsson, Kristoffer Söderström, Mattias Larsson, Patrik Frisk, Robert Pettersson and Tomas Wallin
- Producer(s): Patrik Frisk, Takida

Takida singles chronology
"Losing" (2006)	"Jaded" (2006)

"Losing" is a song by the Swedish rock band Takida and was the first single released from their debut album ...Make You Breathe. The song, which was released as a single on January 30, 2006, was co-produced by Takida and Patrik Frisk at Sidelake Studios in Sundsvall, Sweden.

== Chart performance ==
Losing entered the Swedish Top 60 at number two on 9 February 2007, which was also its peak position. In total it spent six weeks on the chart at positions #2, #5, #26, #4, #4 and #49.

== Track listing ==
CD single (Sweden)

1. Karina 3:47
2. Losing (Video)
3. Takida Live (Video)

== Charts ==
=== Weekly charts ===
Chart (2006)	Peak position
Sweden (Sverigetopplistan)	2

=== Year-end charts ===
Chart (2006)	Position
Sweden (Sverigetopplistan)	79
