= Curly Sue (song) =

Single by Takida

from the album Bury The Lies
- Released: 10 October 2007 (swe)
- Recorded: February–April 2007
- Genre: Rock
- Length: 3:53
- Label: Ninetone Records
- Songwriters: Patrik Frisk, Mattias Larsson, Fredrik Pålsson, Robert Petterson, Kristoffer Söderström, Tomas Wallin
- Producers: Patrik Frisk, Takida

Takida singles chronology
"Halo" (2007)	"Curly Sue" (2007)	"The Dread" (2008)

"Curly Sue" is a song by the Swedish rock band Takida and was the second single released from their second album, Bury the Lies. The song was released as a single on 10 October 2007. The song was co-produced by Takida and Patrik Frisk at Sidelake Studios in Sundsvall, Sweden.

== Reception ==
The track received varied reviews from the press. Örnsköldsviks Allehanda called the song "one of the albums low water marks" and "plain".

== Chart performance ==
According to IFPI it went gold in Sweden in May 2009.

The song entered the Swedish Top 60 at fifty-two on 4 October 2007 and peaked at number one on 24 July 2008. All and all it spent a total of 63 weeks on the chart which makes it the longest-running single ever on the chart, and puts the single as #1 of the Top 100 of all Singles in the Swedish charts since 1975.

The band also had a huge success with the song on the Tracks chart. The song entered the chart at spot twenty on 20 October 2007 and had climbed to number one ten weeks later, a spot that it held for ten weeks. It spent 50 weeks and over a year on the chart and was the most successful song of 2008. As of 21 June 2009 it holds the longevity record on the chart as well.

The song had a huge success on Svensktoppen where it entered the chart on the second of February 2008, later on peaking at number two and spending a total of 54 weeks on the chart. Making it the ninth longest-running single there.

== Charts ==
=== Weekly charts ===
Chart (2007–2008)	Peak position
Sweden (Sverigetopplistan)	1

=== Year-end charts ===
Chart (2008)	Position
Sweden (Sverigetopplistan)	4

== Certifications ==
Region	Certification	Certified units/sales
Sweden (GLF)	Platinum	20,000^{^}
^{^} Shipments figures based on certification alone.
