= Battle of Brunflo =

Part of the Torstenson War

- Part of the Torstenson War
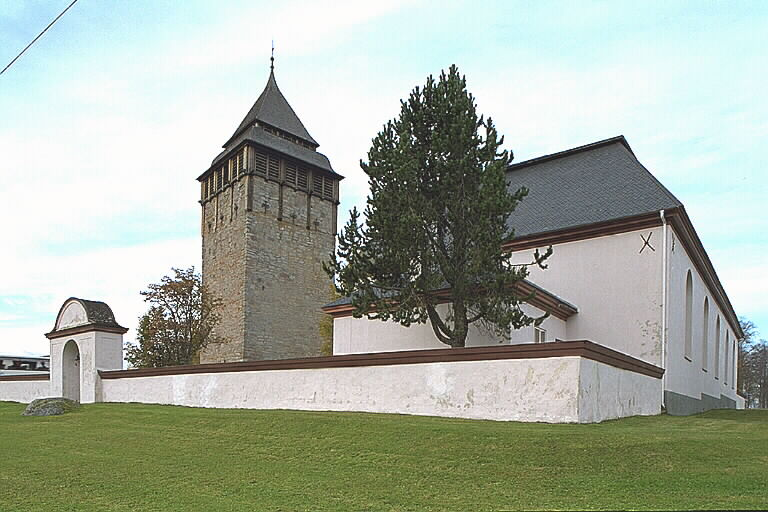
- Photograph of the church in Brunflo, taken in 1998
Date	11 March 1644
Location	Brunflo, Jemtland, Denmark–Norway (present-day Jämtland, Sweden) 63°05′N 14°49′E
Result	Swedish victory
Territorial changes	Brunflo is occupied by Swedish forces

Belligerents
(yes) Swedish Empire	Denmark–Norway

Commanders and leaders
(yes) Henrik Fleming (yes) Sven Ram †	Christopher Rasmussøn

Units involved
(yes) Three infantry companies	Rasmussen's detachment

Strength
Unknown number of men At least two guns	c. 300 men

Casualties and losses
6 killed 18 wounded	c. 70 killed Several wounded

The battle of Brunflo (Note: According to historian Michael Fredholm von Essen, it was "more of a skirmish") took place on 11 March 1644 during the Torstenson War between Denmark and Sweden.

Following a Swedish incursion into Jemtland (present-day Jämtland) by Henrik Fleming on 7 March 1644, Swedish and Norwegian troops encountered each other at Lake Revsund. Despite no fighting occurring, the Norwegians withdrew. The Norwegian commander in the province, Jacob Ulfeldt, sent Christopher Rasmussøn to Brunflo with some 300 men.

After a failed attack on Brunflo by ten Swedish dragoons, which was repulsed, they were attacked by the entire Norwegian force, being driven back to the east of Bodal. Following a clash in a forest between Bodal and Hornsjön, the Norwegians withdrew.

Two other stands, one at Bodal, Lunne, and Hälle, and the other at Gärde, both failed. Following these, the remaining Norwegians retreated, and Ulfeldt soon abandoned Jemtland entirely.

== Background ==
Frustrated with Danish actions during the Thirty Years' War, Swedish Chancellor Axel Oxenstierna began planning a preemptive war with Denmark in May 1643.

In late 1643, the war began with a Swedish invasion of Holstein by Lennart Torstensson. Another Swedish army led by Gustav Horn invaded Scania, intending to split Danish forces.

Despite ruling out Swedish offensives from Västergötland and Värmland, the Swedish government believed an incursion into Jämtland was appropriate to "take the Norwegian route through there and towards Norrland". Henrik Fleming was put in charge of the expedition by the War College, assisted by Hans Strijk.

Henrik Fleming arrived in Hudiksvall by the end of February 1644. Estimates of the size of the total Swedish force vary. Historian Birger Steckzén estimated it at 1,500 men, historian Michael Fredholm von Essen estimated it at 1,600 men, while historians Arnold Munthe and Carl Oscar Munthe estimated it at 2,500 men. Additionally, it had eight guns at its disposal.

== Prelude ==
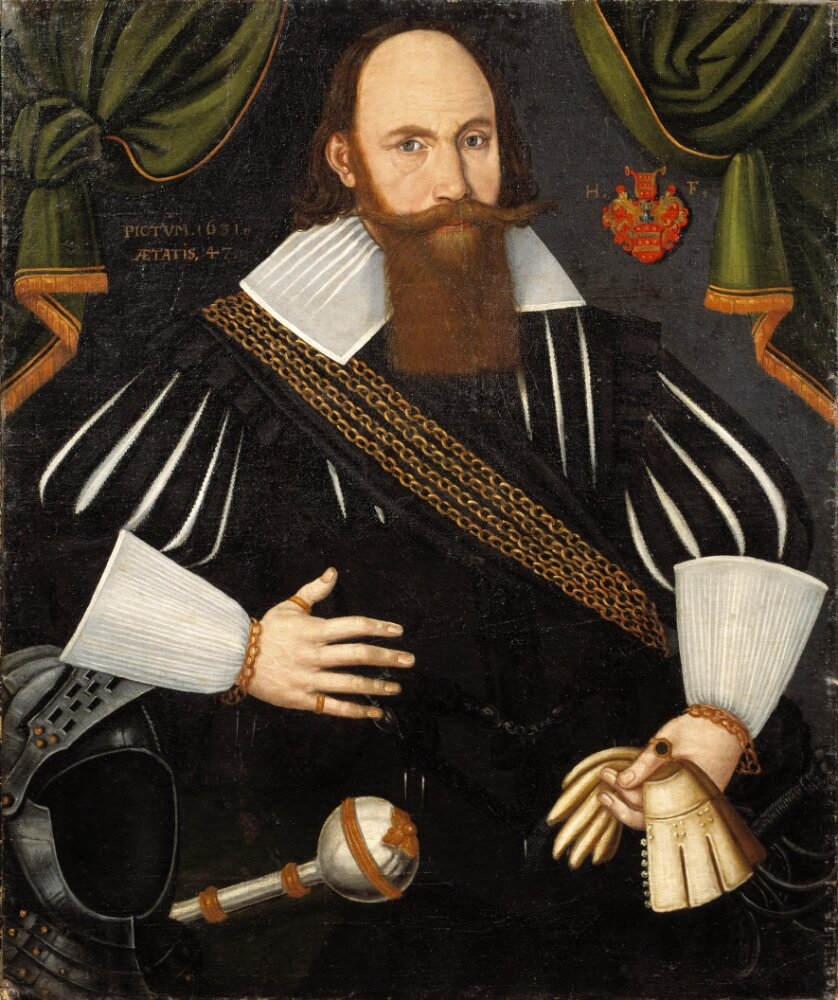
Portrait of Fleming by Jacob Heinrich Elbfas in 1631

After reaching the border on 7 March, Fleming's troops rested there. Soon, the Swedes entered the province, forcing local outposts to withdraw. Upon arriving at Grimnäs on 9 March, Fleming sent a detachment of 100 troops to Sundsjö to link up with Strijk, though the detachment withdrew to Grimnäs as a Norwegian force had taken a favorable position near Gällösundet.

Despite occupying an important pass at Gällösundet, the commander of Norwegian forces in Jämtland, Jacob Ulfeldt, apparently became uncertain. Norwegian forces were dispersed, and the advance of Strijk's forces from the north had become a threat.

Nevertheless, Ulfeldt advanced onto the ice at Lake Revsund on 10 March, seeking to reconnoiter the strength of Fleming's force and possibly inflict losses. However, no fighting occurred. This was because the Norwegian dragoons remained protected by their infantry, and Fleming feared that they would outflank him. Instead, the Swedes withdrew into their camp.

== Battle ==
=== Initial attack on Brunflo ===
On 11 March, Ulfeldt abandoned the position at Gällösundet and withdrew to Frösön. After seeing the strong Swedish force, he remarked that he would not be able to resist the Swedes and ordered Captain Christopher Rasmussøn, who was at Berg, to withdraw to Brunflo.

On the same day, Fleming ordered his forces to advance, hoping to catch the retreating Norwegians. Although Ulfeldt was able to escape, Fleming was informed that Rasmussøn and his force of some 300 men were encamped at Brunflo. The Norwegian sentries were driven back to the church in Brunflo after an attack by ten Swedish dragoons. These dragoons, however, were forced to withdraw after a counterattack by the Norwegians.

=== Later fighting ===
During this, the main Swedish force was ordered by Fleming to quickly march towards Hornsjön to meet him there. While he was gone, the Swedish dragoons were forced to retreat further east of Bodal after Rasmussøn attacked them with his entire force. The Swedish and Norwegian infantry then clashed in a forest between Bodal and Hornsjön. The Norwegians, however, were forced to retreat after fifteen minutes of intense fighting, leaving their provisions behind. Initially, fourteen Norwegians were discovered to have been killed during the fighting, but an additional 40 were discovered in the forest.

The Norwegians then made a stand at Bodal, Lunne, and Hälle. During the fighting, Sven Ram of the Hälsinge Regiment was killed, alongside several other Swedish troops. However, when the Swedish artillery opened fire, the Norwegians once more retreated, fleeing like "flocks of sheep".

Possibly in Gärde, the Norwegians made one last stand, firing at the Swedes from the houses. Despite this, the Swedes forced their way into the buildings, killing the Norwegians inside, and set the village on fire. Afterwards, assuming the Norwegians would once again make a stand at Brunflo, three Swedish infantry companies and two guns were sent there. Seeing the Swedish troops approaching Brunflo with beating drums and banners, the remaining Norwegians retreated.

== Aftermath ==
Per Fleming's report, the Norwegians suffered either around 70, or more than 70 killed in total, with many others being badly wounded. By comparison, the Swedes suffered six killed and 18 wounded.

Following the battle, many peasants came to the Swedish camp, pleading for mercy. Fleming continued his march toward Frösö sconce on 13 March, assuming the Norwegians would resume fighting there. However, Ulfeldt instead chose to retreat to Norway. Jonas Hedberg attributes this decision to Ulfeldt's lack of artillery.

== See also ==
- Assault on Mörsils Sconce – Part of the Torstenson War
