= Bräcke railway station =

Railway station in Bräcke, Sweden

Bräcke
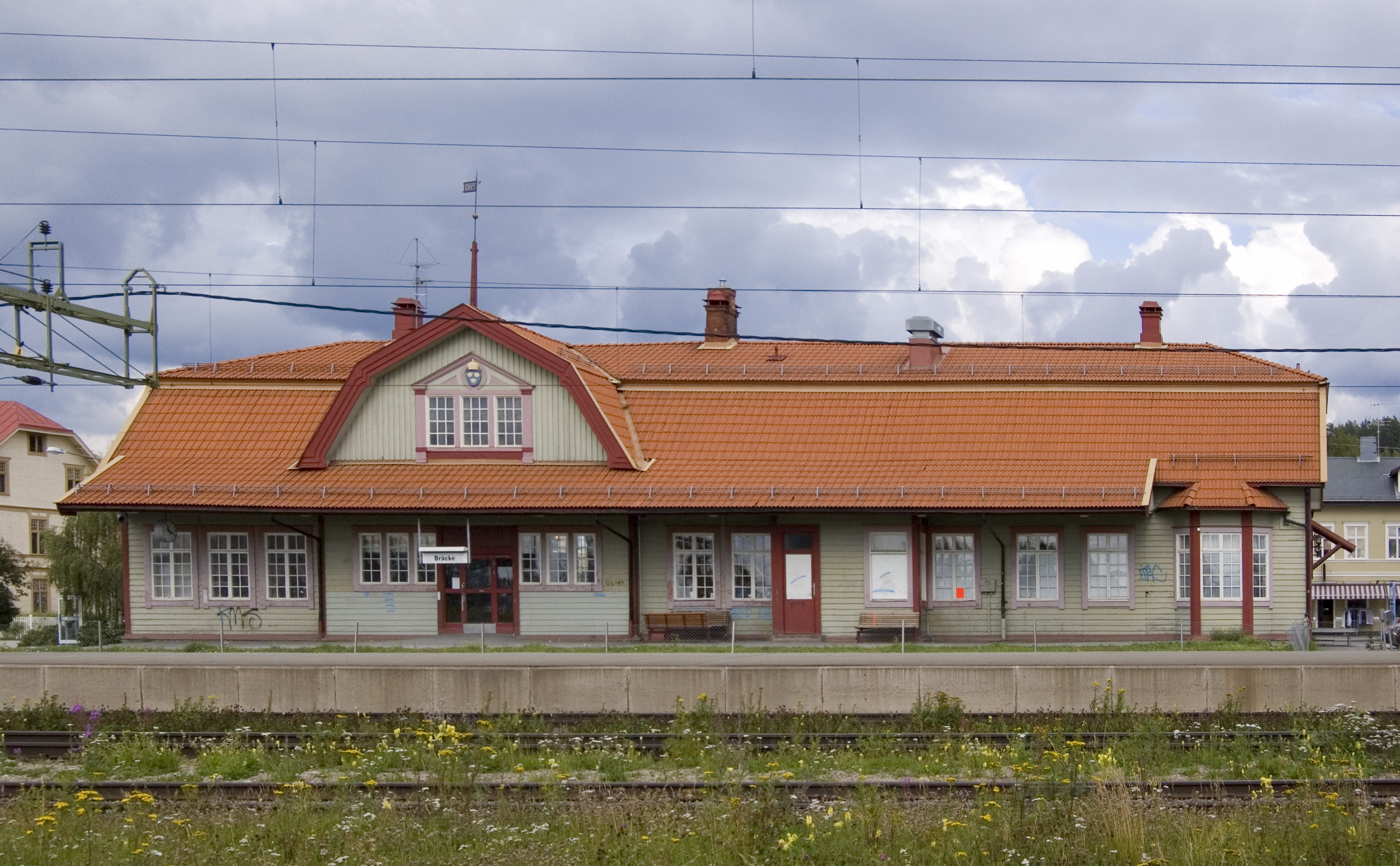

General information
- Location: Bräcke, Bräcke Municipality, Jämtland county Sweden
- Coordinates: 62°45′0″N 15°25′4″E
- Elevation: 291 metres (955 ft)
- Owner: Jernhusen
- Lines: Central Line; Main Line Through Upper Norrland
- Tracks: 2

Construction
- Accessible: Yes

Other information
- Station code: Bä

History
- Opened: 1874

Services
Preceding station	SJ	Following station
Östersund C towards Duved	Central Line InterCity	Ånge towards Stockholm C
Terminus	Northern Main Line X2000	Ånge towards Stockholm C
Östersund C towards Duved	Gothenburg-Umeå-Duved	Ånge towards Göteborg C
Preceding station	Norrtåg	Following station
Gällö towards Storlien	Central Line	Ånge towards Sundsvall C
Location

Bräcke railway station (Swedish: Bräcke järnvägsstation) is a railway station located at Bräcke in Jämtland County, Sweden.

It is located along the Central Line. It is also located at the southern end of the Main Line Through Upper Norrland, a line which has only freight trains since 2012.

The first railway station was built and opened when the original line Stockholm-Trondheim reached Bräcke in 1878. A new station building (still remaining) was built in 1910.

There are two tracks with a platform between. The platform is reached by a level crossing over one of the tracks.
