= Reason to Cry =

Reason to Cry may refer to:

- "Reason to Cry", a song by Lucinda Williams on Essence, 2001
- "Reason to Cry", a song by Takida on ...Make You Breathe, 2006
