= Ånge IF =

Swedish football club

- Full name: Ånge IF Idrottsförening
- Founded: 1 October 1980; 46 years ago
- Ground: Ånge Idrottsplats; Ånge; Sweden
- Capacity: 1,000
- Coach: Anders Strandlund
- League: Division 5 Medelpad
Home colours	Away colours

Ånge IF is a Swedish football club located in Ånge.

== Background ==
Ånge IF currently plays in Division 5 which is the seventh tier of Swedish football. They play their home matches at the Ånge Idrottsplats in Ånge.

The club is affiliated to Medelpads Fotbollförbund.

== Season to season ==
Season	Level	Division	Section	Position	Movements
1999	Tier 6	Division 5	Medelpad	2nd	Promoted
2000	Tier 5	Division 4	Medelpad	9th	
2001	Tier 5	Division 4	Medelpad	12th	Relegated
2002	Tier 6	Division 5	Medelpad	10th	
2003	Tier 6	Division 5	Medelpad	10th	
2004	Tier 6	Division 5	Medelpad	12th	
2005	Tier 6	Division 5	Medelpad	7th	
2006*	Tier 7	Division 5	Medelpad	4th	Promoted
2007	Tier 6	Division 4	Medelpad	4th	
2008	Tier 6	Division 4	Medelpad	4th	
2009	Tier 6	Division 4	Medelpad	6th	
2010	Tier 6	Division 4	Medelpad	2nd	Promotion Playoffs
2011	Tier 6	Division 4	Medelpad	1st	Promotion Playoffs – Promoted
2012	Tier 5	Division 3	Förbundsserie	3rd	
2013	Tier 5	Division 3	Förbundsserie	1st	Promoted
2014	Tier 4	Division 2	Norrland	5th	
2015	Tier 4	Division 2	Norrland	3rd	
2016	Tier 4	Division 2	Norrland	14th	Relegated
2017	Tier 8	Division 6	Medelpad	7th	Chose to move down from Division 3 due to lack of players
2018	Tier 7	Division 5	Medelpad	6th	

* League restructuring in 2006 resulted in a new division being created at Tier 3 and subsequent divisions dropping a level.
