= Tandsbyn =

- Location within Jämtland Location within Sweden
- Coordinates: 63°00′N 14°45′E
- Country: Sweden
- Province: Jämtland
- County: Jämtland County
- Municipality: Östersund Municipality

Area
  - Total: 0.58 km^{2} (0.22 sq mi)

Population (31 December 2010)
  - Total: 374
  - Density: 640/km^{2} (1,700/sq mi)
- Time zone: UTC+1 (CET)
  - Summer (DST): UTC+2 (CEST)

Tandsbyn is a locality situated in Östersund Municipality, Jämtland County, Sweden with 374 inhabitants in 2010.

== Sports ==
The following sports clubs are located in Tandsbyn:

- Tandsbyns FK
