= Bury the Lies =

Studio album by Takida
- Released: 16 May 2007
- Recorded: January – April 2007
- Genre: Post-grunge
- Length: 43:15
- Label: Ninetone (Swe), Roadrunner (International)
- Producer: Takida, Patrik Frisk

Takida chronology
...Make You Breathe (2006)	Bury the Lies (2007)	The Darker Instinct (2009)

Singles from The Darker Instinct
- 1. "Halo" Released: 16 April 2007; 2. "Curly Sue" Released: 10 November 2007; 3. "The Dread" Released: 2008; 4. "Handlake Village" Released: 2008

Professional ratings
Review scores
Source	Rating
Aftonbladet	2/5 stars
Expressen	2/5 stars
Göteborgs-Posten	2/5 stars
Svenska Dagbladet	1/5 stars
Rock Hard	8.5/10 stars

Bury the Lies is the second studio album by Swedish rock band Takida. The album debuted at number one on the Swedish Albums Chart and has sold platinum in the country, 40 000 copies. All in all the album has spent 90 weeks on the chart making it the 29th best-charting album on the chart of all times.

== Track listing ==
1. "The Dread" 3:05
2. "Hole In the Ground" 4:18
3. "Feeble Pride" 3:29
4. "Tear It Up Again" 4:28
5. "Halo" 3:57
6. "Ashamed" 3:48
7. "Curly Sue" 3:53
8. "Bad Seed" 3:58
9. "Poisoned" 3:58
10. "Snypah" 4:05
11. "Handlake Village" 4:18

All songs composed by Fredrik Pålsson, Kristoffer Söderström, Mattias Larsson, Patrik Frisk, Robert Pettersson & Tomas Wallin

== Charts and certifications ==
=== Weekly charts ===
Chart (2007–08)	Peak position
Swedish Albums (Sverigetopplistan)	1

=== Year-end charts ===
Chart (2007)	Position
Swedish Albums (Sverigetopplistan)	87
Chart (2008)	Position
Swedish Albums (Sverigetopplistan)	8
Chart (2009)	Position
Swedish Albums (Sverigetopplistan)	74

=== Certifications ===
Region	Certification	Sales/Shipments
Sweden	Platinum	40,000+

== Release history ==
Region	Date	Format	Label
Finland	April 17, 2008	CD, digital download	Universal Music
Germany	October 2, 2009	CD, digital download	Roadrunner Records
Sweden	May 16, 2007	CD, digital download	Universal Music
