= Fåker =

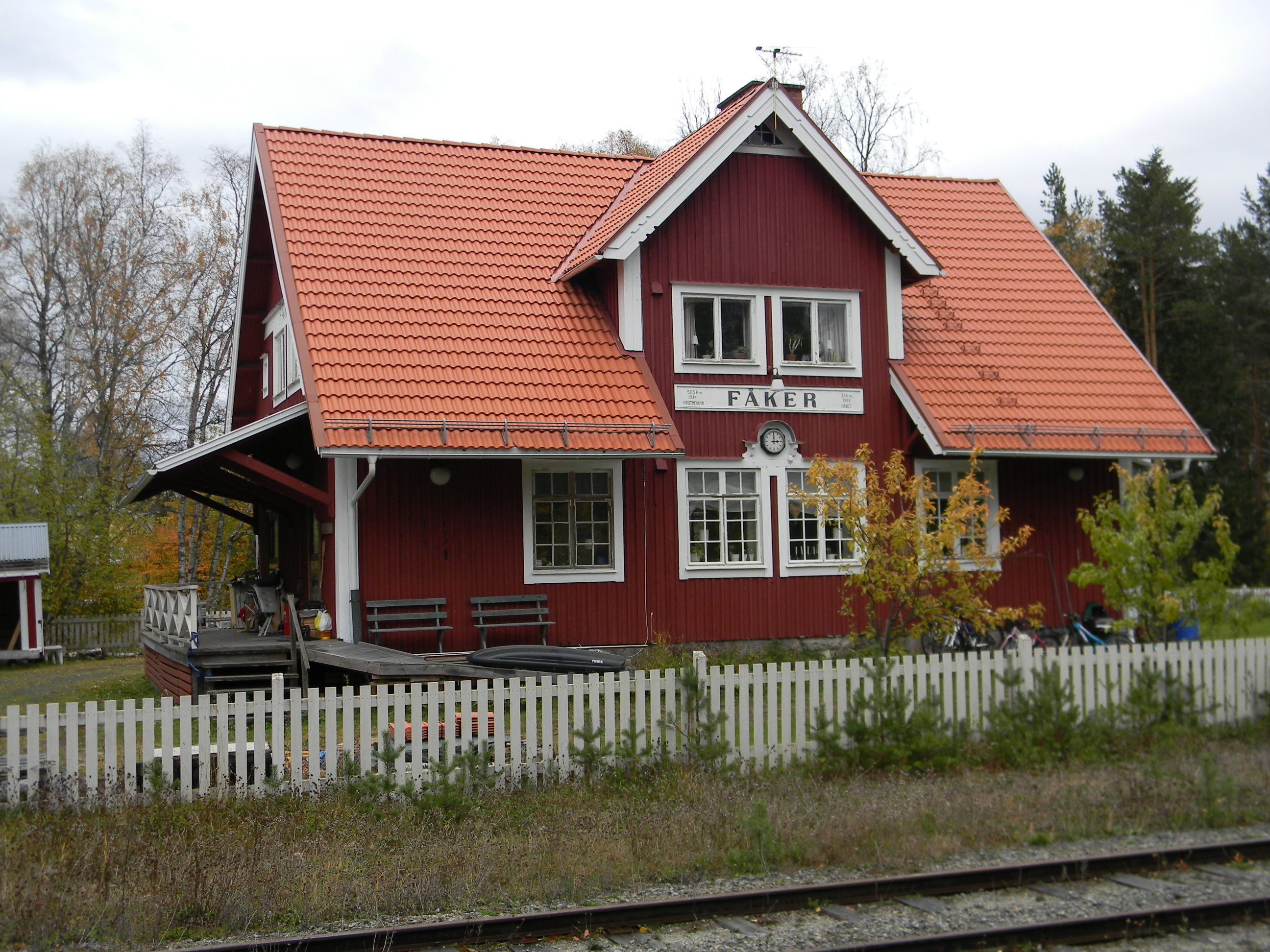
- Fåker railway station

- Location within Jämtland Location within Sweden
- Coordinates: 62°59′N 14°35′E
- Country: Sweden
- Province: Jämtland
- County: Jämtland County
- Municipality: Östersund Municipality

Area
  - Total: 0.27 km^{2} (0.10 sq mi)

Population (2005-12-31)
  - Total: 209
  - Density: 780/km^{2} (2,000/sq mi)
- Time zone: UTC+1 (CET)
  - Summer (DST): UTC+2 (CEST)

Fåker is a village situated in Östersund Municipality, Jämtland County, Sweden with 209 inhabitants in 2005.
