= Lit, Sweden =

Lit
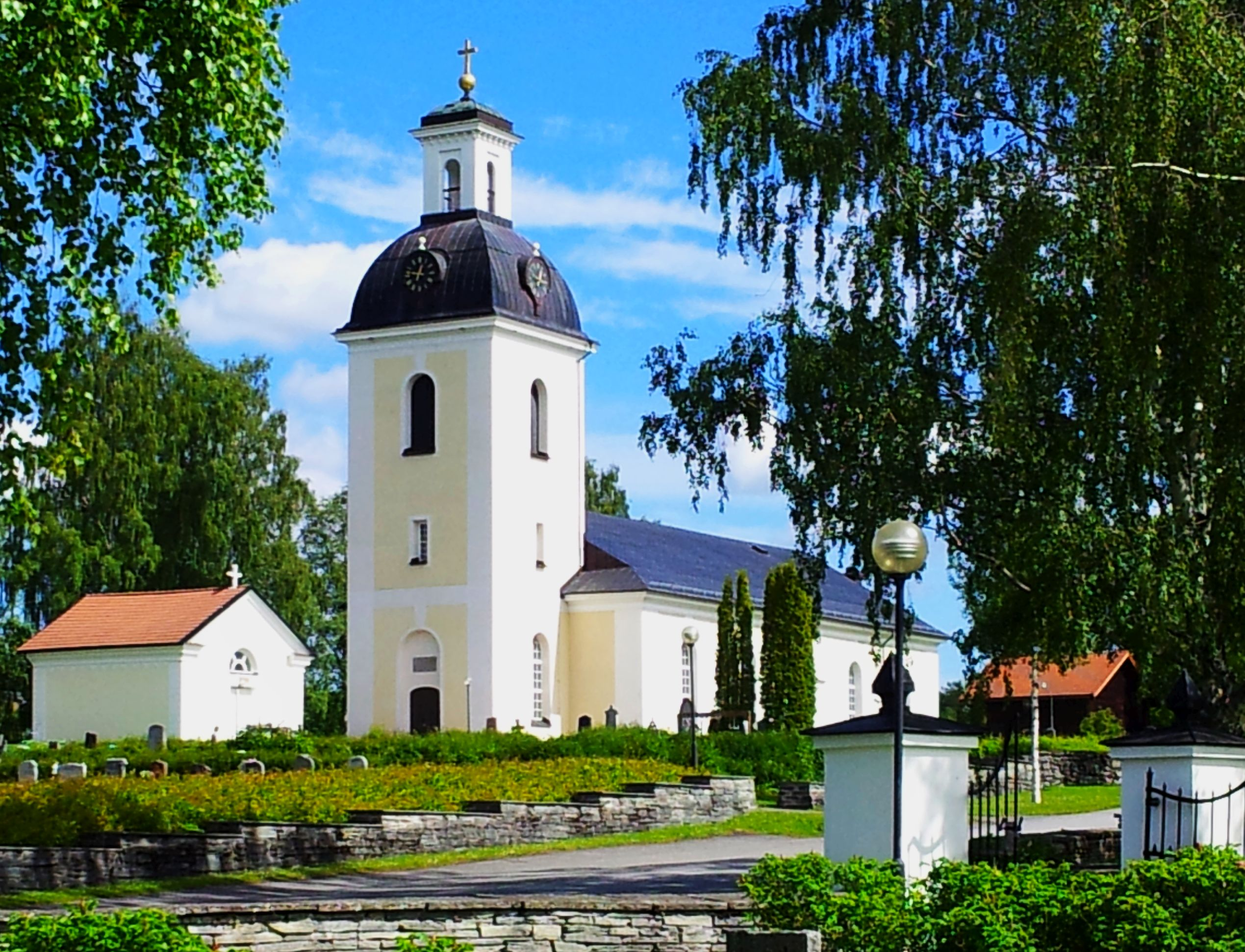
- Church in Lit

- Location within Jämtland Location within Sweden
- Coordinates: 63°19′N 14°49′E
- Country: Sweden
- Province: Jämtland
- County: Jämtland County
- Municipality: Östersund Municipality

Area
  - Total: 1.25 km^{2} (0.48 sq mi)

Population (31 December 2010)
  - Total: 1,040
  - Density: 832/km^{2} (2,150/sq mi)
- Time zone: UTC+1 (CET)
  - Summer (DST): UTC+2 (CEST)

Lit is a locality situated in Östersund Municipality, Jämtland County, Sweden with 1,040 inhabitants in 2010.
