= Assault on Mörsils Sconce =

Part of the Torstenson War

- Part of the Torstenson War
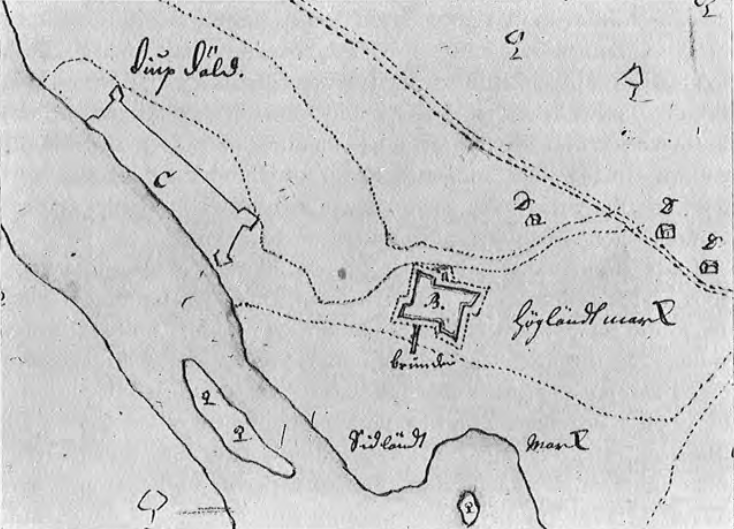
- 1676 map of Mörsils old (C) and new sconce (B) by Jeremias Rosk
Date	30 or 31 May 1644
Location	Mörsils sconce, Jemtland, Denmark–Norway (present-day Jämtland, Sweden) 63.27525°N 13.62111°E
Result	Dano-Norwegian victory
Territorial changes	Mörsils sconce is captured by Dano-Norwegian forces

Belligerents
Denmark–Norway	(yes) Swedish Empire

Commanders and leaders
Christopher Rasmussøn	(yes) Olof Svensson †

Units involved
Jemtland company	(yes) Mörsil sconce garrison

Strength
359 men	c. 100 men

Casualties and losses
Unknown	Everyone killed

The assault on Mörsils Sconce occurred on either 30 or 31 May 1644 during the Torstenson War between Denmark–Norway and Sweden.

In March 1644, Swedish forces led by Henrik Fleming occupied Jemtland, with Hans Strijk becoming governor of the province. The Swedes were left with some 450 men to defend the province, around 100 men being stationed in Mörsils sconce, the rest in Frösö sconce.

Soon, a Norwegian force led by Jacob Ulfeldt invaded Jemtland. The Jemtland company, some 359 men led by Christopher Rasmussøn, hid themselves in a forest behind a farm with the help of a local farmer. After being invited to a harvest feast, the Swedes were ambushed and killed by Rasmussøn's force.

Another version of events purports that around 50 Swedes were initially killed outside the sconce, with the rest being killed in their sleep inside the sconce after having surrendered the day prior.

== Background ==
In December 1643, after months of preparations by Axel Oxenstierna, Swedish forces invaded Denmark, sparking the Torstenson War.

In March 1644, a Swedish army of around 1,600 men under the command of Henrik Fleming invaded Jemtland. After some minor skirmishes with Norwegian forces led by Jacob Ulfeldt, they successfully occupied the entire province. After occupying the province, Hans Strijk was made governor, immediately working on securing Swedish control.

=== Prelude ===
Soon after beginning work on the administrative and military reconstruction in the province, reports of an incursion by a Norwegian force under the command of Jacob Ulfeldt reached Strijk. In total, Ulfeldt's force consisted of 1,100 to 1,200 men, divided into five companies, with two being held in reserve. Additionally, the Jemtland company, 359 men in total, was led by Christopher Rasmussøn.

Swedish forces in the province amounted to around 450 men, divided between Mörsils sconce with some 100 men under the command of Olof Svensson, and the rest stationed in Frösö sconce.

==== Mörsils sconce ====
Mörsils sconce was located on top of a sand ridge on the northern shore of Liten. It was rectangular, with bastions in the corners.

== Assault ==
The assault occurred either on 30 or 31 May.

According to the Mörsil parish chronicle, a farmer in Byom opened negotiations with Christopher Rasmussøn, having his men hide themselves in the forest behind the farm. The farmer invited Olof Svensson and his men to a harvest feast. A local custom had risen in Jemtland, where people would help in hauling timber, gathering hay, or harvesting in exchange for food and drink due to a shortage of draught animals and manpower.

Svensson, who posted sentries along the road, believed he was safe, coming to the farmer. Once the Swedes were "sitting at the height of their merriment", the farmer retreated into his house, giving a signal to Rasmussøn and his men to attack. The Swedes were shot and killed by the Dano-Norwegians, including one man who was stabbed while hiding in a chimney.

A different version of events is given in Christoffer Stenklyft's 1684 map of roads in the province. He stated that 50 Swedes outside the sconce were killed, and the other half, who were inside the sconce, were killed in their sleep after surrendering the day prior.

== Aftermath ==
After capturing Mörsils sconce, the Norwegian forces moved towards Frösö sconce, held by Hans Strijk. Despite being outnumbered, Strijk held out for two months. He eventually capitulated on 9 or 10 August, receiving free departure back to Borgsjö sconce in Medelpad, escorted by eight companies.

== See also ==
- Assault on Christianspris – Part of the Torstenson War
