= You Learn (Takida song) =

Single by Takida

from the album The Burning Heart
- Released: 21 November 2011 (swe)
- Genre: Post-Grunge
- Length: 3:53
- Label: Se7en Records
- Songwriters: Robert Petterson, Christian Rehn

Takida singles chronology
"Haven stay" (2011)	"You Learn" (2011)

"You Learn" is a song by the Swedish rock band Takida and was the third single released from their The Burning Heart album. The song was released as a single on 21 November 2011.

== Chart performance ==
The song entered the Swedish Top 60 at number 52 on 4 November 2011 and peaked at number five on 27 January 2012. It spent a total of 29 weeks on the chart, making it Takida's second longest-running single on that chart.

== Charts ==
=== Weekly charts ===
Weekly chart performance
Chart (2012)	Peak position
Sweden (Sverigetopplistan)	5

=== Year-end charts ===
2011 year-end chart performance
Chart (2011)	Position
Sweden (Sverigetopplistan)	77

2012 year-end chart performance
Chart (2012)	Position
Sweden (Sverigetopplistan)	47

== Certifications ==
Certifications
Region	Certification	Certified units/sales
Sweden (GLF)	4× Platinum	160,000^{‡}
^{‡} Sales+streaming figures based on certification alone.
