= Tandsbyns FK =

Swedish football club

- Full name: Tandsbyns Fotbollklubb
- Nickname(s): Täpa
- Founded: 1998; 27 years ago
- Ground: Tandsbyn Nya IP; Tandsbyn; Sweden
- Chairman: Tony Arnqvist
- Coach: Mattias Björch
- League: Div 4 Jämtland/Härjedalen
Home colours

Tandsbyns FK is a Swedish football club located in Tandsbyn.

== Background ==
The club was originally known as Tandsbyns IF and dates back to 1945. It was active in football, athletics, cycling and all kinds of winter sports. In 1991 a separate football club was established in collaboration with another club and was named T/F-91 (Tandsbyn/Fåker-91). In 1996/97 this club was forced to disband but in 1998 Tandsbyns FK was formed for boys and girls in the Tandsbyn area. In the spring of 2003 the club's oldest boys entered Division 5 and won the league title convincingly to gain promotion to Division 4 where the club currently remains.

Tandsbyns FK plays in Swedish football Division 4 Jämtland/Härjedalen which is the fifth tier of Swedish football. They play their home matches at the Tandsbyn Nya IP in Tandsbyn.

The club is affiliated to Jämtland-Härjedalens Fotbollförbund. Tandsbyns IF entered the Svenska Cupen on 4 occasions.

== Squad ==
Goalkeepers: Thomas Dahlberg, Ahmad "Pantern" Bekdash, Edvin Hallqvist.

Defenders: Robin Peter Sprängberg, Mac’n’cheese Kristensson, Jonas Qvistlund, Billy Calleb, Willy Ljungqvist, Ville Olofsson, Ville Bylund, Rasmus "Raz" Österström, Markus Mikaelsson, Alvin Rolén.

Midfielders: Edvin (Täpac) Johannesson, Tony Arnqvist, Joel Alberto Johansson, Pontus Englund, Mergim Krasniq, Hugo Werme, Andreas Lundkvist.

Forwards: Lucas Mario Johansson, Fredrik Palmäng Ez, Elias Westin, Fredrik Festin, Leo Lindberg, Petter Ljungqvist, Rasmus Lööv.

Coaches Richard Hamner, Mathias Björch, Fredrik "Frippe" Seger.

== Season to season ==
Season	Level	Division	Section	Position	Movements
2003	Tier 6	Division 5	Jämtland/Härjedalen	1st	Promoted
2004	Tier 5	Division 4	Jämtland/Härjedalen	7th	
2005	Tier 5	Division 4	Jämtland/Härjedalen	5th	
2006*	Tier 6	Division 4	Jämtland/Härjedalen	5th	
2007	Tier 6	Division 4	Jämtland/Härjedalen	3rd	
2008	Tier 6	Division 4	Jämtland/Härjedalen	5th	
2009	Tier 6	Division 4	Jämtland/Härjedalen	6th	
2010	Tier 6	Division 4	Jämtland/Härjedalen	8th	
2011	Tier 6	Division 4	Jämtland/Härjedalen	4th	
2012	Tier 6	Division 4	Jämtland/Härjedalen		
2013	Tier 6	Division 4	Jämtland/Härjedalen		
2014	Tier 6	Division 4	Jämtland/Härjedalen		
2015	Tier 6	Division 4	Jämtland/Härjedalen		
2016	Tier 6	Division 4	Jämtland/Härjedalen	2nd	Promoted
2017	Tier 5	Division 3	Mellersta Norrland Norr	11th	Demoted
2018	Tier 6	Division 4	Jämtland/Härjedalen		
2019	Tier 6	Division 4	Jämtland/Härjedalen		
2020	Tier 6	Division 4	Jämtland/Härjedalen		
2021	Tier 6	Division 4	Jämtland/Härjedalen		

* League restructuring in 2006 resulted in a new division being created at Tier 3 and subsequent divisions dropping a level.
