= Sundsvall–Torpshammar Railway =

Overview
- Status: Merged with Mittbanan
- Owner: Private, until 1885; Statens Järnvägar, since 1885
- Termini: Sundsvall; Torpshammar

Service
- Type: Railway
- System: Swedish railways
- Operator(s): Private, until 1885; Statens Järnvägar, since 1885

History
- Opened: 1874

Technical
- Line length: Approximately 60 km (37 mi)
- Number of tracks: Single
- Track gauge: 1,435 mm (4 ft 8 1/2 in) standard gauge
- Old gauge: 1,067 mm (3 ft 6 in)
- Electrification: No

Sundsvall–Torpshammar Railway Swedish: Sundsvall–Torpshammars Järnväg was a private railway between Torpshammar and Sundsvall in Sweden built in 1874. It was operated by the private company by the same name until 1884 when it was bought by Statens Järnvägar (SJ) and merged with the rest of Norrländska Tvärbanan, that later changed name to Mittbanan.

The original railway was built in narrow gauge, but it was converted to 1,435 mm (4 ft 8 1/2 in) standard gauge after the government take-over for SEK 3.6 million. The railway also had a branch line, Matfors–Vattjom Railway that stayed privately owned, but was served by SJ. In 1890, the ownership and operating on the branch line was transferred to Tuna Järnvägs AB.
