= Corroded (band) =

Swedish heavy metal band

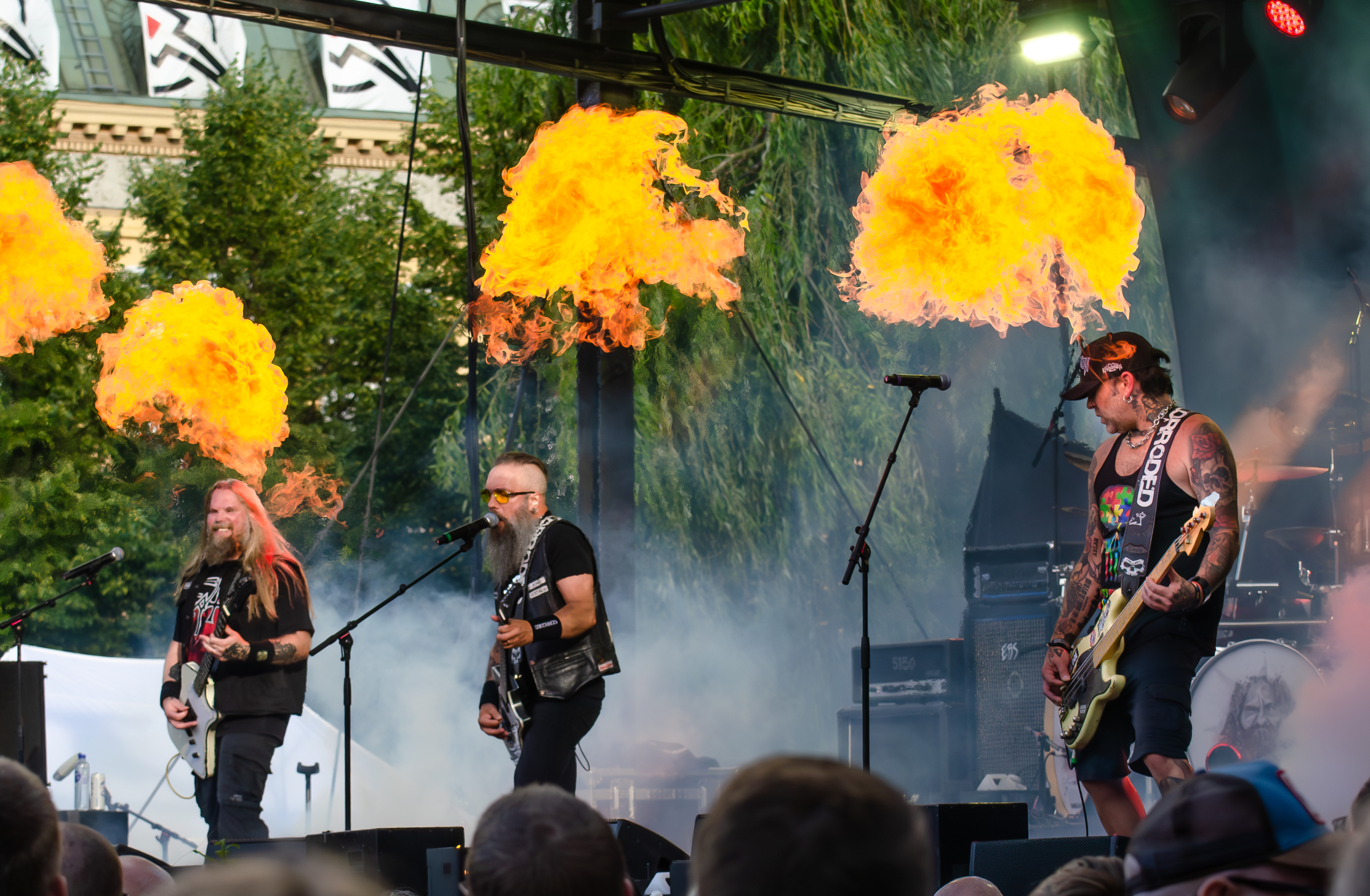
- Corroded performing in 2023

Background information
- Origin: Ånge, Sweden
- Genres: Alternative metal; post-grunge
- Years active: 2004–present
- Labels: Ninetone Records
- Members: Jens Westin; Peter Sjödin; Tomas Andersson; Bjarne Elvsgård; Per Soläng
- Past members: Niklas Källström; Martin Källström; Fredrik Westin; Tommy Rehn

Corroded is a Swedish alternative metal/post-grunge band from Ånge, formed in 2004. They are best known for their song "Time and Again", which was the theme song for the Swedish 2009 Survivor television series on TV4. The band's second album Exit to Transfer, released in October 2010 by Ninetone Records, reached number 6 on the Swedish national record chart Sverigetopplistan. In 2013, Corroded played a European tour supporting Australian band Airbourne.

Musically, the band is influenced by Machine Head, Black Sabbath, and Disturbed, among others.

== Members ==
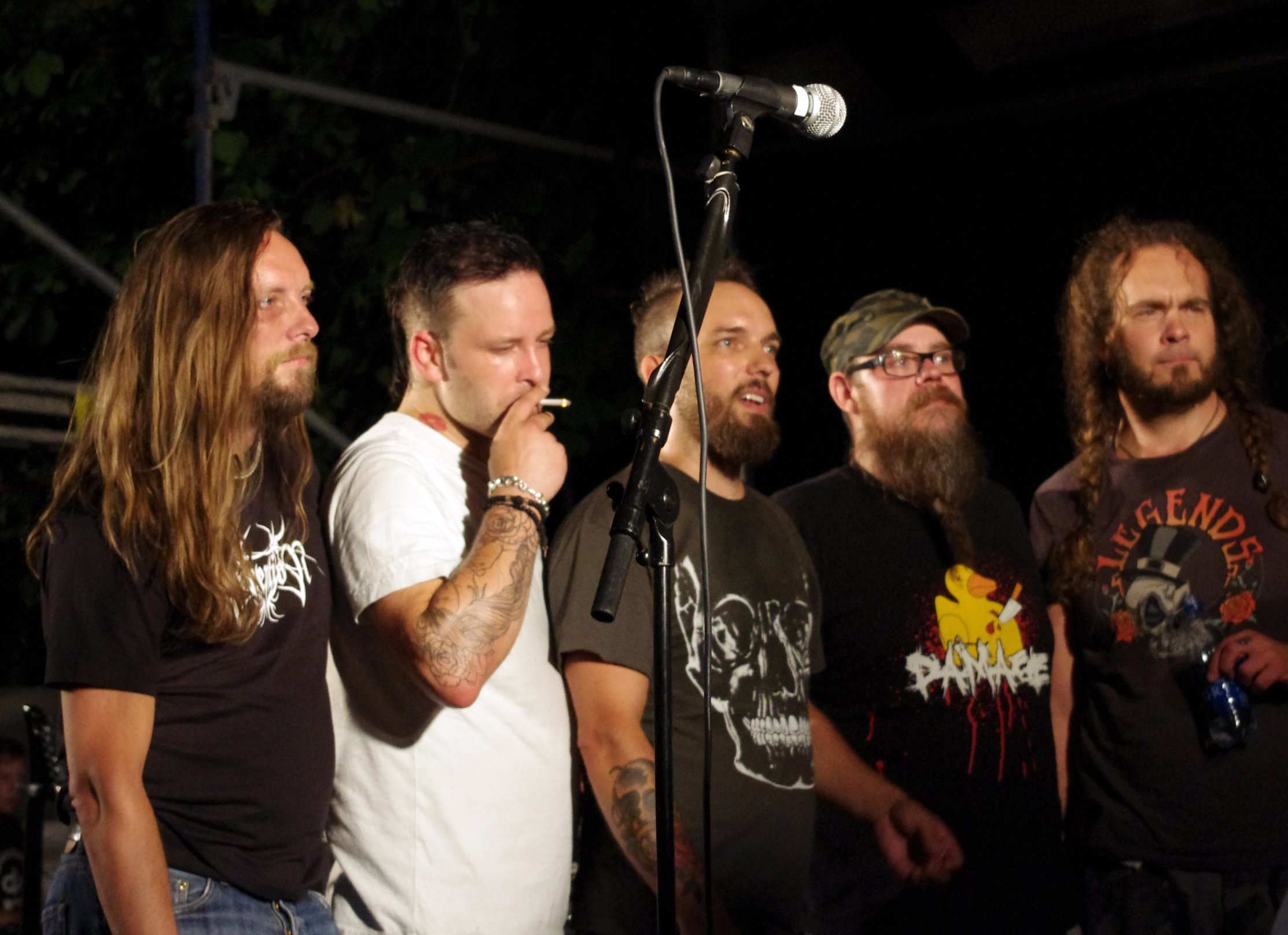
Corroded at Pretzeltown Festival 2011

=== Current members ===
- Jens Westin – vocals, rhythm guitar
- Tomas Andersson – lead guitar
- Bjarne Elvsgård – bass
- Per Soläng – drums

=== Former members ===
- Niklas Källström – bass
- Martin Källström – drums
- Fredrik Westin – lead guitar
- Tommy Rehn – lead guitar
- Peter Sjödin – rhythm guitar
- Sam Söderlindh – lead guitar

== Discography ==
=== Studio albums ===
Year	Album details	Peak position SWE
2009	Eleven Shades of Black: Released: 8 June 2009	18
2010	Exit to Transfer: Released: 6 October 2010	6
2012	State of Disgrace: Released: 3 October 2012	6
2017	Defcon Zero: Released: 14 April 2017	
2019	Bitter: Released: 25 January 2019	
2023	Plague: Released: 17 November 2023	

=== Singles ===
Year	Single	Peak position SWE	Album
2009	"Time and Again"	24	Eleven Shades of Black
2010	"Piece by Piece"	27	Exit to Transfer
2014	"House of Hate"		None

=== Video games ===
The band's song "Age of Rage" was featured in DICE's online shooter Battlefield Play4Free. Their song "Come On In" was featured in the soundtrack for the sports video game Major League Baseball 2K11.
