= Östersund Municipality =

Östersund Municipality Östersunds kommun
- Municipality
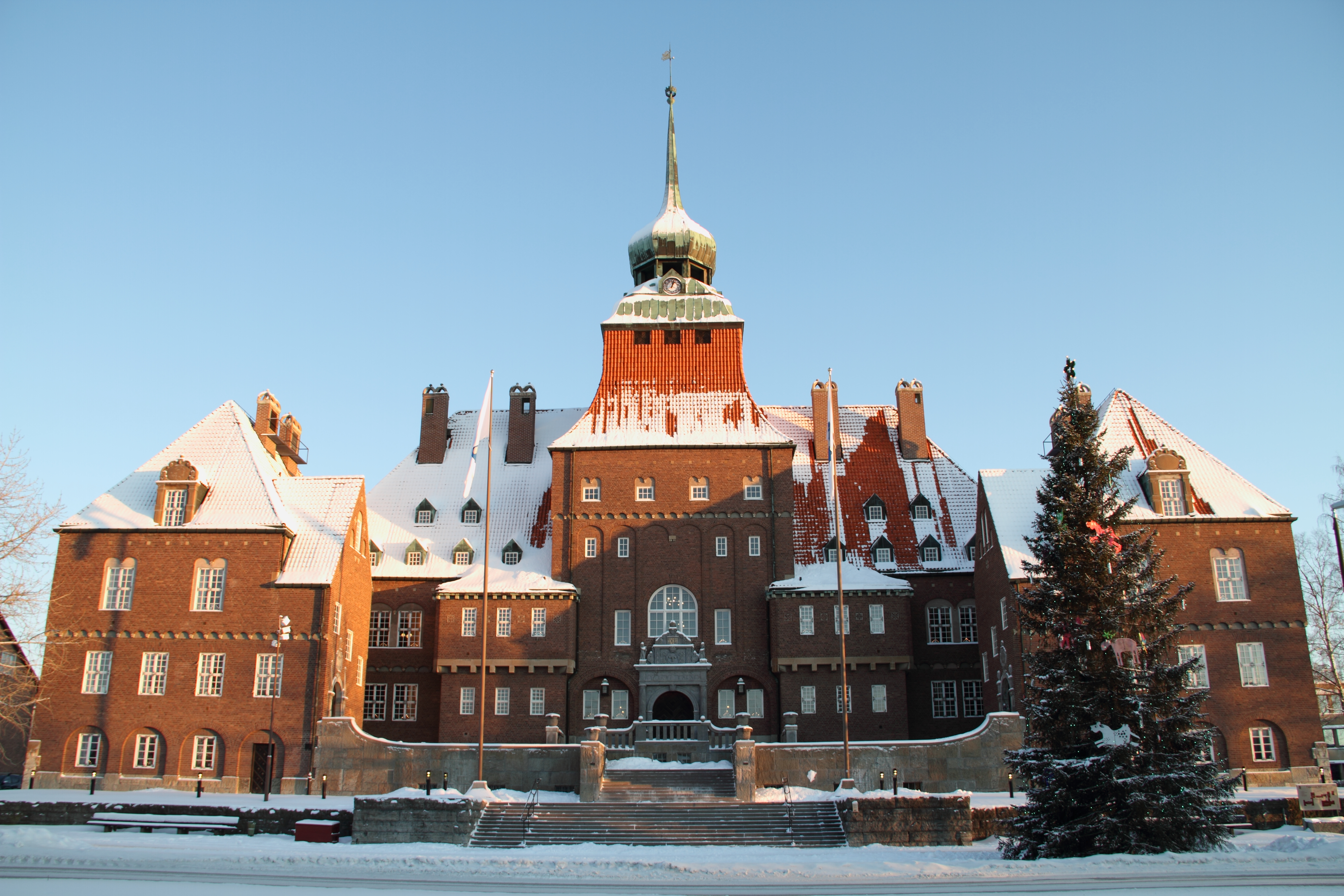
- Östersund city hall

- Flag Coat of arms

- Coordinates: 63°11′N 14°40′E
- Country: Sweden
- County: Jämtland County
- Seat: Östersund

Area
  - Total: 2,501.08 km^{2} (965.67 sq mi)
  - Land: 2,208.31 km^{2} (852.63 sq mi)
  - Water: 292.77 km^{2} (113.04 sq mi)
- Area as of 1 January 2014.

Population (30 June 2025)
  - Total: 64,900
  - Density: 29.4/km^{2} (76.1/sq mi)
- Time zone: UTC+1 (CET)
  - Summer (DST): UTC+2 (CEST)
- ISO 3166 code: SE
- Province: Jämtland
- Municipal code: 2380
- Website: www.ostersund.se

Östersund Municipality (Swedish: Östersunds kommun; Southern Sami: Staaren tjïelte) is a municipality in Jämtland County in northern Sweden. Its seat is located in Östersund, which is also the county seat of Jämtland County.

The present municipality was formed in 1971 by the amalgamation of the City of Östersund with five surrounding rural municipalities.

== Localities ==
There are ten localities (or urban areas) in Östersund Municipality:

#	Locality	Population
1	**Östersund** (part of)	43,359
2	Brunflo	3,916
3	Lit	1,051
4	Ope	441
5	Tandsbyn	396
6	Häggenås	351
7	Orrviken	239
8	Optand	238
9	Marieby	218
10	Fåker	209

The municipal seat in bold

== Politics and governance ==
Swedish municipalities are responsible for government-mandated duties, and elections for the municipal council (kommunfullmäktige) are held every four years, parallel to the general elections.

=== Political history ===
Östersund gained a city council (stadsfullmäktige) in 1863, known as Östersunds stad, and each member was elected through a single-winner voting system. Sweden was democratized in the end of the 1910s and a more parliamentarian election system was introduced. Östersund continued to be governed by the burghers, unlike Sweden nationally. The dominating parties were the conservatives, the freeminded and the social democrats. The latter did become the single largest party in 1938 but due to a strong centre-right majority it remained in opposition. The only other party present in Östersund was the communists, though they had little support in the city, having entered the city council in 1922 and lost representation completely in 1930. The conservatives was by far the largest party and had a majority of its own with 18 seats in 1922. After the municipal elections of 1950 the situation had changed. The conservatives was the smallest party with 10 seats, the liberals (now represented by the Liberal People's party) had 11 and the social democrats 19. This was in contrast to the turnout on a national level, where the social democrats had been the dominant party for over a decade gaining e.g. 46 percent of the votes in the general elections of 1948. In 1952 a social democrat was appointed chairman of Östersund's governing body, due to the lack of political blocs and the strive for mutual agreements.

A majority for the social democrats was achieved first in 1962. The political scene was shortly afterwards altered, in 1966, when the agrian and rural Centre Party (previously known as Peasant's League) got into the city council, after broadening its scope to include non-farmers, alongside the Christian Democrats (though not present on the national political scene) and the communists returning after a 40-year period of absence. The burghers was thus back in power. Following the rise of Swedish welfare the small municipalities could not cope with their assigned duties. As a result, large municipality blocks were introduced and Östersunds stad was heavily enlarged and several districts kilometres away from the city were included in the new Östersund Municipality.

The first election for the new municipality was held in 1970 and it was a large success for the Centre Party, both locally in Östersund and nationally due to its opposition towards centralisation. Having entered in 1966 with 4 seats it now possessed one fourth of the total number of seats (which was mainly due to support from the city, not the newly included rural areas). Block politics formation became prominent and the Centre Party became the leading party for the centre-right block, whilst the Social Democrats came to dominate the left block. The Social Democrats regained power in 1980 and has since governed Östersund Municipality until present day (excluding a brief period in the 1990s) supported by the communists (after 1991 known as the Left Party) and occasionally the Green Party. The Green Party has been in the municipal council since 1982.

== Demographics ==
This is a demographic table based on Östersund Municipality's electoral districts in the 2022 Swedish general election sourced from SVT's election platform, in turn taken from SCB official statistics.

Residents include everyone registered as living in the district, regardless of age or citizenship status. Valid voters indicate Swedish citizens above the age of 18 who therefore can vote in general elections. Left vote and right vote indicate the result between the two major blocs in said district in the 2022 general election. Employment indicates the share of people between the ages of 20 and 64 who are working taxpayers. Foreign background is defined as residents either born abroad or with two parents born outside of Sweden. Median income is the received monthly income through either employment, capital gains or social grants for the median adult above 20, also including pensioners in Swedish kronor. The section about college graduates indicates any degree accumulated after high school.

In total there were 49,635 Swedish citizens of voting age resident in the municipality. 58.5% voted for the left coalition and 40.2% for the right coalition. Indicators are in percentage points except population totals and income.

Location	Residents	Citizen adults	Left vote	Right vote	Employed	Swedish parents	Foreign heritage	Income SEK	Degree
Location			%	%					
Brittsbo-Lugnviksstrand	1,531	1,049	59.5	39.6	92	93	7	30,600	57
Brunflo Storviken	2,168	1,668	54.1	45.2	82	94	6	25,230	32
Brunflo Södergård	1,476	1,116	55.6	42.7	84	89	11	24,790	35
Brunflo Änge	1,383	1,094	56.9	42.4	85	92	8	22,237	35
Centrala Lit	1,167	852	56.3	42.9	78	86	14	21,525	29
Eriksberg-Solliden	1,750	1,476	61.7	37.4	79	92	8	25,708	64
Erikslund-Blomängen	1,620	1,240	62.4	36.7	86	90	10	27,683	56
Frösödal	1,474	1,180	62.9	36.0	85	90	10	26,782	57
Fåker-Tandsbyn	1,976	1,550	57.1	41.8	85	94	6	24,169	35
Hornsberg Nedre	1,120	956	61.0	36.3	79	90	10	22,821	47
Hornsberg Övre	1,082	887	59.5	39.5	80	87	13	25,261	52
Häggenås	1,162	909	50.9	46.6	86	95	5	24,098	33
Karlslund	1,306	1,092	59.7	39.4	85	92	8	27,635	59
Körfältet	1,522	1,092	60.8	37.5	73	71	29	21,302	28
Lit-Landsbygd	2,072	1,615	50.3	47.5	88	96	4	27,265	39
Lugnviks C	1,571	1,312	61.0	37.8	80	87	13	22,642	35
Marieby	1,668	1,204	51.3	47.8	91	95	5	30,467	57
Marielund-Odenskog	1,182	830	62.5	36.5	67	74	26	20,615	39
Nedre Blomängen	1,133	986	59.1	39.4	83	92	8	24,160	47
Norr	1,345	948	57.5	41.3	79	85	15	27,923	60
N Frösön-Lövsta	2,419	1,734	60.6	38.5	82	90	10	28,845	63
Norra Odenslund	1,573	1,285	56.9	41.3	78	80	20	23,191	47
Odensala Nedre	2,166	1,646	56.9	42.2	90	95	5	29,609	56
Odensala Tavelbäcken	1,773	1,396	59.5	39.3	85	89	11	24,833	48
Odensala Övre	1,694	1,283	63.5	36.1	88	94	6	28,887	56
Orrviken	1,433	1,052	54.9	43.7	90	95	5	27,612	48
Sjukhusområdet	1,447	1,242	64.0	35.3	76	84	16	24,632	52
Storsjöstrand-Odensvik	1,987	1,567	56.8	42.2	84	89	11	25,552	47
Söder	1,393	1,161	58.8	39.3	80	85	15	23,751	44
Södra Odenslund	1,409	1,226	62.2	36.6	81	93	7	26,297	52
S Valla-Mjäle	1,851	1,390	61.2	37.9	81	88	12	26,969	56
Torvalla By-Ope	1,228	915	54.1	44.7	84	91	9	28,428	47
Torvalla C	1,652	1,009	63.8	32.2	65	53	47	17,934	22
Torvalla Fjällmon	2,242	1,681	65.8	32.7	81	88	12	25,339	42
Torvalla Skogsmon	1,310	895	56.1	41.6	78	80	20	24,495	32
Torvalla Ängsmon	1,486	963	52.6	45.5	78	82	18	23,655	26
Universitetet	1,597	1,310	59.4	37.8	71	79	21	21,358	51
Västra Frösön	1,541	1,155	62.2	37.7	88	94	6	30,006	66
Östberg	1,307	1,084	60.5	38.6	81	90	10	25,647	50
Östersund nedre C	1,699	1,478	56.2	42.4	72	82	18	22,108	46
Östersund övre C	1,332	1,107	51.6	47.0	80	80	20	24,529	42
Source: SVT

== See also ==
- List of governors of Jämtland County
- Rensved
- Swedish Armed Forces
- Swedish Air Force
- Biathlon World Championships
