= The Burning Heart (album) =

Studio album by Takida
- Released: 27 July 2011
- Genre: Post-grunge, pop rock
- Label: Se7en Records
- Producer: Chris Rehn and Takida

Takida chronology
| The Darker Instinct (2009) | The Burning Heart (2011) | All Turns Red (2014) |

Singles from The Burning Heart
- 1. "Was It I?" Released: 23 May 2011; 2. "Haven Stay" Released: 27 June 2011; 3. "You Learn" Released: 27 November 2011

The Burning Heart is the fourth studio album by Swedish rock band Takida. The album entered the albums chart in Sweden on 5 August 2011 and topped it on 12 August 2011. By 27 January 2011, the album had stayed in the chart for 26 weeks. The album was certified gold according to the official Swedish chart website.

== Track listing ==
1. "Haven Stay"
2. "Willow and Dead"
3. "In the Water"
4. "Was It I?"
5. "Fire Away"
6. "The Artist"
7. "Ending Is Love"
8. "The Fear "
9. "The Burning Heart "
10. "Silence Calls (You and I)"
11. "It's My Life"
12. "You Learn"

== Charts ==
=== Weekly charts ===
| Chart (2011) | Peak position |
|---|---|
| Swedish Albums (Sverigetopplistan) | 1 |

=== Year-end charts ===
| Chart (2011) | Position |
|---|---|
| Swedish Albums (Sverigetopplistan) | 17 |
| Chart (2012) | Position |
| Swedish Albums (Sverigetopplistan) | 43 |
