= The Darker Instinct =

Studio album by Takida
- Released: September 2, 2009
- Genre: Post-grunge, pop rock
- Length: 49:55
- Label: Se7en Records, Versity Rights
- Producer: Jacob Hellner, Tom van Heesch

Takida chronology
Bury the Lies (2007)	The Darker Instinct (2009)	The Burning Heart (2011)

Singles from The Darker Instinct
- 1. "As You Die" Released: June 22, 2009; 2. "The Things We Owe" Released: August 2009

Professional ratings
Review scores
Source	Rating
Sundsvalls Dagblad	3/5 stars
Dagens Nyheter	1/5 stars
Expressen	1/5 stars
Kristianstadsbladet	(extremely unfavorable)
Norran	2/5 stars
Svenska Dagbladet	1/5 stars
Sydsvenskan	2/5 stars
Upsala Nya Tidning	3/5 stars

The Darker Instinct is the third studio album by Swedish rock band Takida. It was recorded at Big Island Sound in Stockholm, Sweden. The album was released on September 2, 2009. The album entered the Swedish album chart at No. 1 and was certified gold after just one week of sales.

The album charted for a total of 41 weeks and was certified platinum during 2010.

== Track listing ==
1. "Get Me Started" 3:52
2. "As You Die" 3:31
3. "End Is Near" 3:32
4. "Never Alone Always Alone" 4:05
5. "The Things We Owe" 3:43
6. "Deadlock" 3:27
7. "Walk On By" 4:16
8. "Caroline" 3:21
9. "Hours" 4:11
10. "Between the Lines" 3:50
11. "Tonight" 3:43
12. "Trigger" 4:02
13. "Too Late" 4:22

== Chart performance ==
Chart (2009)	Peak Position	Certification	Sales/Shipments
Sweden	1	Gold	20,000+

== Release history ==
Region	Date	Format	Label
Finland	September 30, 2009	CD, digital download	Universal Music
Sweden	September 11, 2009	CD, digital download	Universal Music
