= Ånge =

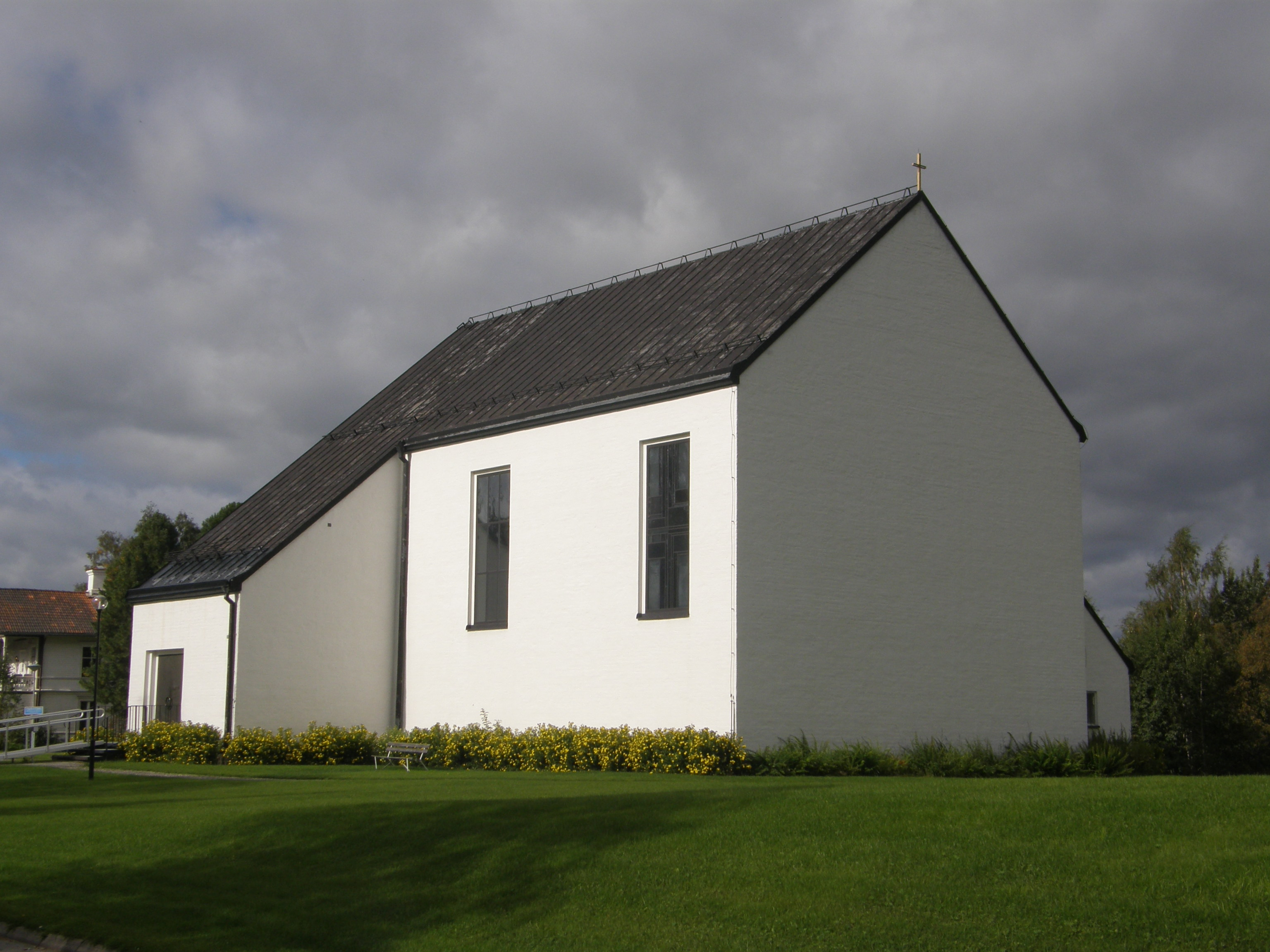
- Ånge Church

- Location within Västernorrland Location within Sweden
- Coordinates: 62°31′N 15°37′E
- Country: Sweden
- Province: Medelpad
- County: Västernorrland County
- Municipality: Ånge Municipality

Area
  - Total: 3.60 km^{2} (1.39 sq mi)

Population (31 December 2010)
  - Total: 2,872
  - Density: 798/km^{2} (2,070/sq mi)
- Time zone: UTC+1 (CET)
  - Summer (DST): UTC+2 (CEST)

Ånge is a locality and the seat of Ånge Municipality in Västernorrland County, Sweden with 2,872 inhabitants in 2010.

Ånge is a railway junction where the northern main line railway (Norra Stambanan) connects with the central main line railway (Mittbanan). The rail yard at Ånge station is a major freight yard for the Central Region.

Ånge is also known in Sweden as "The Swedish version of Seattle" due to an impressive number of bands. Takida, The Grand Opening and Corroded are among many other bands from this area.

== Sport ==
The following sports clubs are located in Ånge:

- Ånge IF
- Ånge IK

== Notable people ==
- Musical group Takida
- Musical group The Citadel
- Musical group The Grand Opening
- Musical group Corroded
- Musical group Kill Kill Pussycat!
- Musical group Blowball
- Football manager Lars Lagerbäck
- Ice hockey player Samuel Påhlsson
- Ice hockey player Elias Pettersson
