= ...Make You Breathe =

Studio album by Takida
- Released: May 29, 2006
- Recorded: January–May 2006
- Genre: Alternative rock
- Length: 42:17
- Label: Ninetone
- Producer: Takida, Patrik Frisk

Takida chronology
...Make You Breathe (2006)	Bury the Lies (2007)

Singles from The Darker Instinct
- 1. "Losing" Released: January 30, 2006; 2. "Jaded" Released: May 22, 2006; 3. "Reason to Cry" Released: May 22, 2006

Professional ratings
Review scores
Source	Rating
Zero	5/10 stars

...Make You Breathe is the debut album by Swedish rock band Takida. It was recorded at Sidelake Studios in Sundsvall, Sweden.

== Track listing ==
All tracks are written by Fredrik Pålsson, Kristoffer Söderström, Mattias Larsson, Patrik Frisk, Robert Pettersson and Tomas Wallin

No.	Title	Length
1.	"Losing"	3:52
2.	"Jaded"	3:12
3.	"Die Alone"	4:07
4.	"D.H.C."	4:03
5.	"Alive"	4:31
6.	"Broken"	3:10
7.	"Reason to Cry"	3:55
8.	"Burning Inside"	3:53
9.	"Evil Eye"	4:32
10.	"What Doesn't Kill You"	3:05
11.	"Sanctuary – Here We Are"	4:02

== Charts ==
Chart performance for ...Make You Breathe
Chart (2006)	Peak position
Swedish Albums (Sverigetopplistan)	7
