= Brunflo =

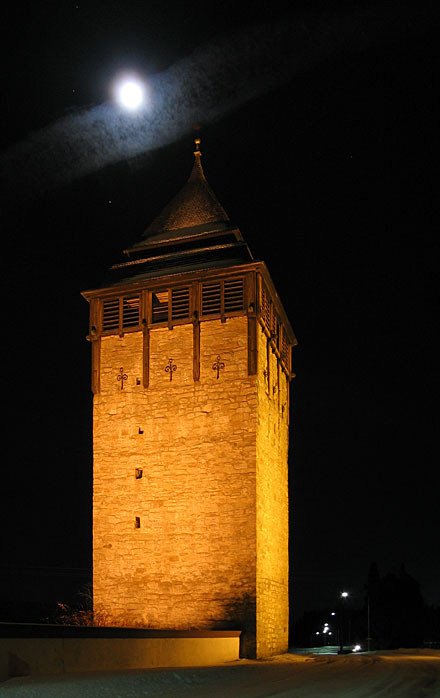
- Tower in Brunflo

- Location within Jämtland Location within Sweden
- Coordinates: 63°05′N 14°49′E
- Country: Sweden
- Province: Jämtland
- County: Jämtland County
- Municipality: Östersund Municipality

Area
  - Total: 2.85 km^{2} (1.10 sq mi)

Population (31 December 2010)
  - Total: 3,890
  - Density: 1,366/km^{2} (3,540/sq mi)
- Time zone: UTC+1 (CET)
  - Summer (DST): UTC+2 (CEST)

Brunflo (Swedish pronunciation: [ˈbrɵ̌nːflʊ]) is a locality situated in Östersund Municipality, Jämtland County, Sweden with 3,890 inhabitants in 2010. It is situated some 15 km south-east of Östersund.

The cyclist Georg Johnsson was born here.

== History ==
In 1644, during the Torstenson War, a battle was fought in Brunflo, resulting in a Swedish victory.

== Sports ==
The following sports clubs are located in Brunflo:

- Brunflo FK
- Brunflo IF

== Works cited ==
- Steckzén, Birger (1928). "Striden om Jämtland 1644—1645". Jämtländska Studier: Festskrift till Eric Festin (in Swedish). 3 (1) 16. Östersund: Heimbygdas Förlag: 263–294. ISSN 0347-5131. OCLC 488042179.
