= Rensved =

- Village
- Location of Rensved within Sweden
- Coordinates: 62°57′N 14°57′E
- Time zone: UTC+1 (CET)
  - Summer (DST): UTC+2 (CEST)

Rensved is a village in Jämtland, Sweden, with three farms.
