= Henrik Fleming =

Swedish nobleman, admiral and diplomat

Henrik Klasson Fleming
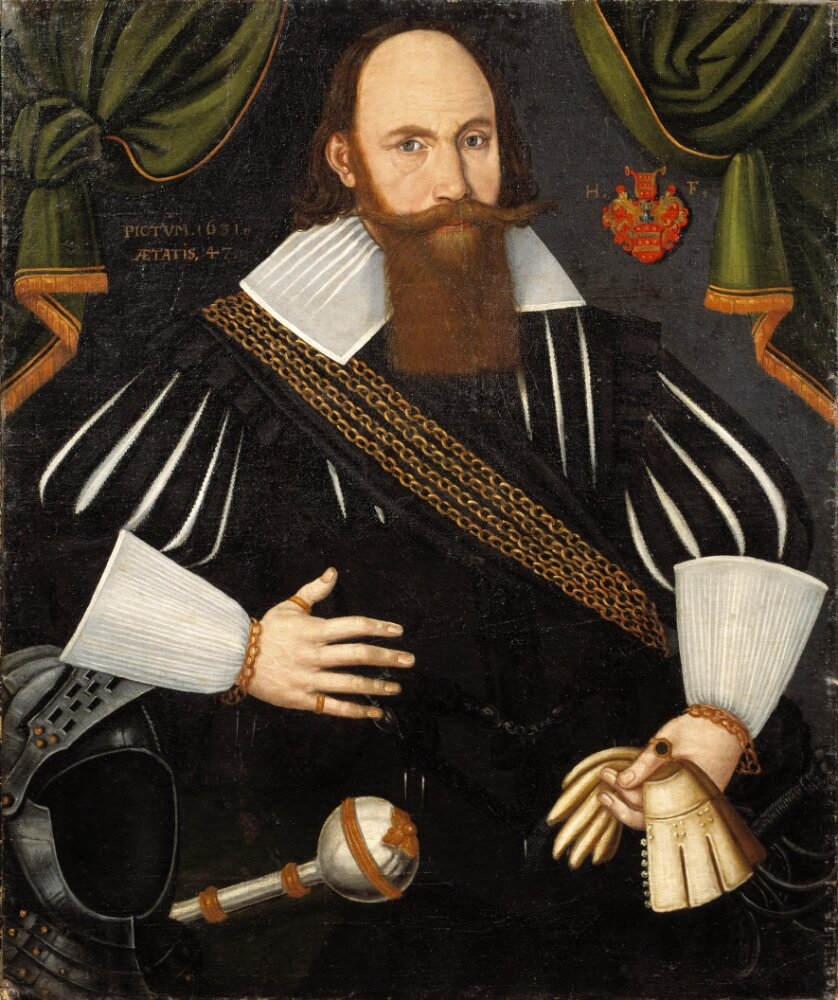
- Portrait by Jacob Heinrich Elbfas, 1631
- Born: 15 August 1584; Åkerholm, Sweden (now Finland)
- Died: 7 November 1650 (aged 66) Stockholm, Sweden
- Rank: Lord Marshal
- Conflicts: Torstenson War; Henrik Fleming's expedition to Jämtland; Battle of Brunflo

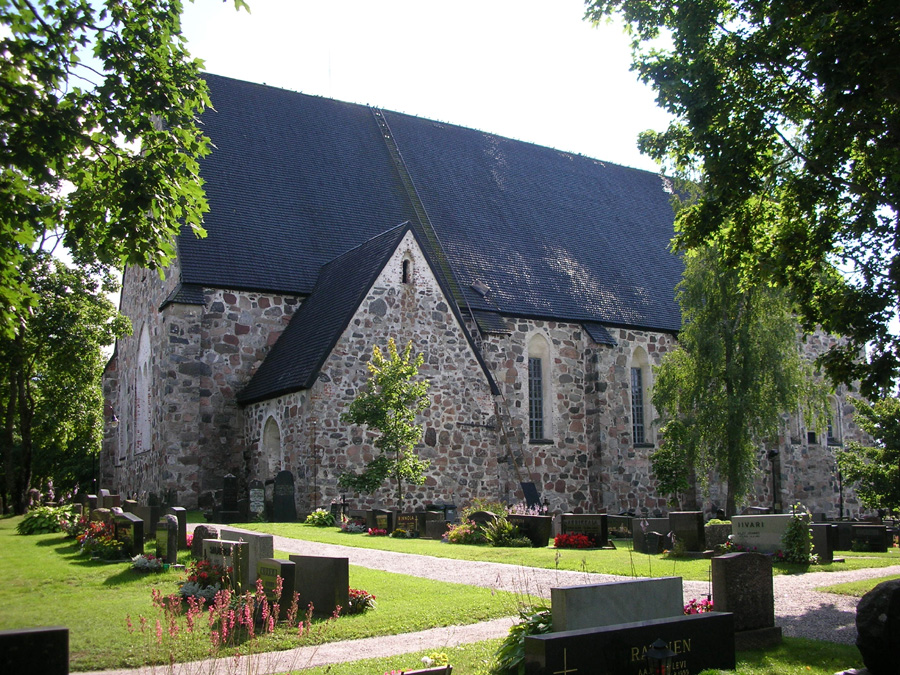
Virmo Church (Mynämäen kirkko)

Henrik Klasson Fleming (15 August 1584 – 7 November 1650) was a member of the Swedish nobility and admiral, diplomat and lord marshal. He was the author of one of the first autobiographies in Swedish, a colourful depiction of his early life which he wrote for his children in a moralising purpose.

== Biography ==
Fleming was born at Åkerholm in Ingå, Uusimaa coast, Finland. He was raised at Yläne and Pöytyä in southwest Finland. He was a student in Rostock University (1602). He was part of the king's command in active military service, having participated as a captain under King Gustavus Adolphus of Sweden in war campaigns against Denmark and Russia.

In 1617 he was a Swedish delegate took part in the conclusion of the Treaty of Stolbovo which ended the Ingrian War. The same year he became governor of the Province of Viipuri and Olavinlinna and colonel of the cavalry at Karelia the following year.

In 1620 he was appointed governor of Ingria, colonel of the Finnish cavalry in 1622 and vice admiral in 1628. Along with Privy Council members Philip von Scheiding (1578-1646) and Erik Karlsson Gyllenstierna (1602-1657) he traveled in March 1634 as envoy to the Grand Duchy of Moscow. He was sharply criticized by the government, as he demanded payment to undertake this assignment. As lord marshal, he led the nobility party during the Riksdag of the Estates deliberations in 1643 and 1644.

As a military officer, one of his major successes was when he led the Swedish forces that conquered Jämtland in 1644. During the conquest, he defeated a force of 300 Jämtlanders at Brunflo.

In his youth he was left without any support from his father who had become a very rich man. He was for a few years struggling with poverty. Later, he supplied goods to the army through trade and leasing, so that by his death he had accumulated a fortune, both in wars and partly on business speculation, of which he used a large portion to benefit his people. He died on 7 November 1650 in Stockholm, Sweden. In 1641, Henrik Fleming had financed the construction of Virmo Church (Mietoisten kirkko) in Mynämäki, Finland. The Fleming family sandstone tomb from the year 1632 is located here.

== Personal life ==
He was son of Governor Klas Hermansson Fleming and Elisabet Henriksdotter Horn as well as the grandson of Henrik Klasson Horn (c.1512 – 1595).

He married his sister-in-law Ebba Erlandsdotter Bååt (1588 – 1630) on 13 March 1608. He was the father of Johan Henriksson Fleming (24 June 1609 – 29 April 1646).

== See also ==
- Finnish nobility
- Swedish nobility
- Polish–Swedish War (1626–29)

== Works cited ==
- Bäckström, Olli (2018). Katajala, Kimmo; Hirvonen, Helena (eds.). Snapphanar and Power States: Insurgency and the Transformation of War in Sweden and Denmark 1643–1645. Joensuu: University of Eastern Finland. ISBN 9789526129020.

Attribution

- This article is based on the translation of the corresponding article of the Swedish Wikipedia. A list of contributors can be found there in the History section.
