= Central Line (Sweden) =

Railway line in Sweden

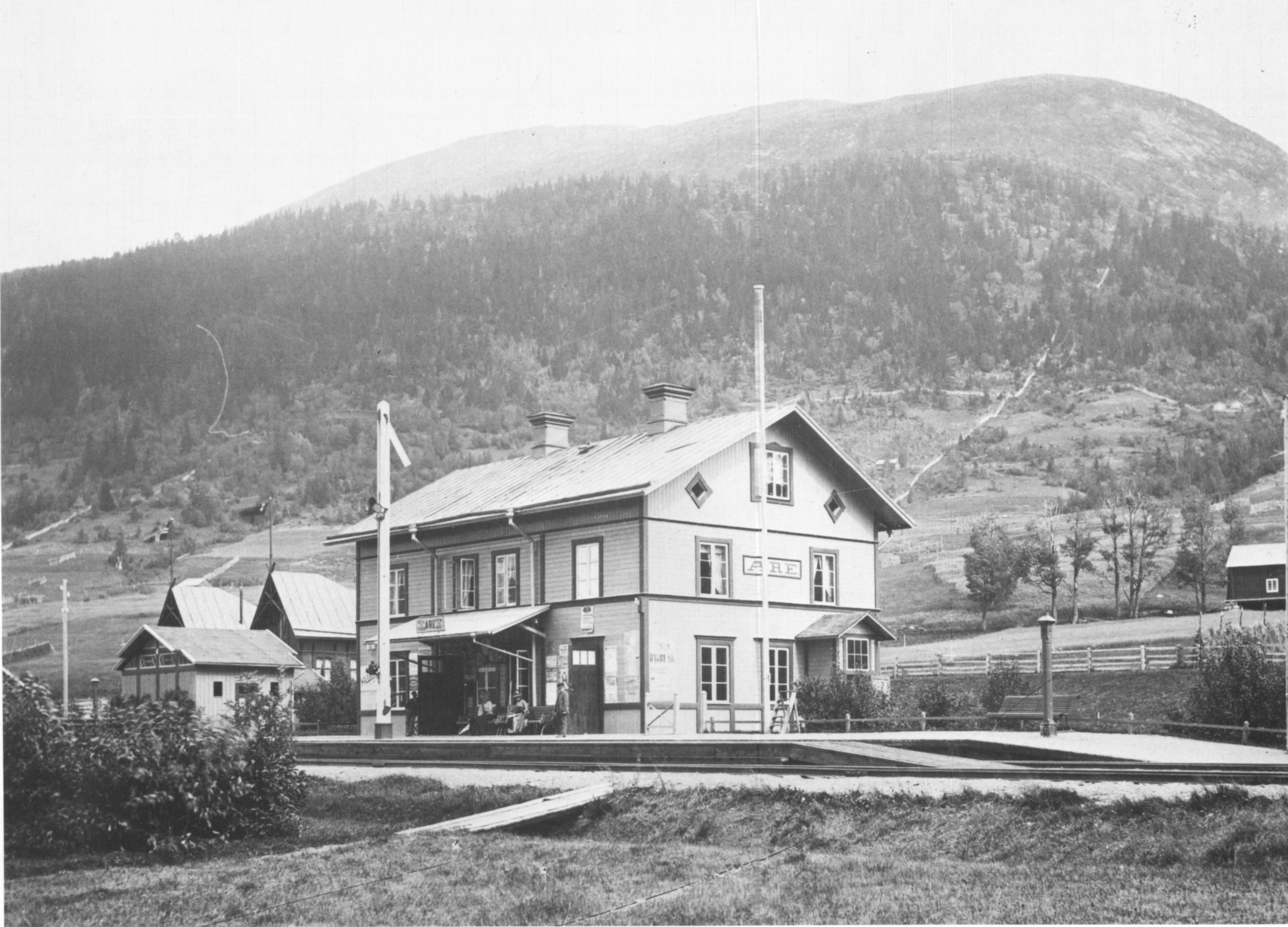
- Åre railway station in the 1890s

Overview
- Owner: Swedish Transport Administration
- Termini: Sundsvall Central Station; Storlien Station

Service
- Type: Railway
- System: Swedish railway network
- Operator(s): SJ; SJ Norge; Veolia Transport
- Rolling stock: X2; Regina; NSB Class 92

History
- Opened: 1878

Technical
- Line length: 358 km (222 mi)
- Number of tracks: Single
- Character: Passenger and freight
- Track gauge: 1,435 mm (4 ft 8 1/2 in) standard gauge
- Electrification: 15 kV 16.7 Hz AC

The Central Line (Swedish: Mittbanan) is a 358-kilometre (222 mi) long railway line between Sundsvall and Storlien in central Sweden (Västernorrland County and Jämtland County). It continues as the 106-kilometre (66 mi) long Meråker Line through Norway to Hell Station and onwards to Trondheim. The railway shares line with Inland Line between Brunflo and Östersund while the line between Ånge and Bräcke is double track. The entire line is electrified at 15 kV 16.7 Hz AC.

SJ AB operates night trains with sleeping cars from Storlien or Duved to either Stockholm, Gothenburg or Malmö. The section between Sundsvall and Trondheim is operated by Tågkompaniet under Norrtåg ownership with Class 92 diesel multiple units between Östersund and Trondheim, and Regina trains between Sundsvall and Östersund. Snälltåget also operates Utmanartåget with a biweekly connection between Storlien and Malmö via Stockholm.

== History ==
The first part of the line was the Sundsvall–Torpshammar Railway, a private, narrow gauge and 60-kilometre (37 mi) long line opened fully in 1878, and its first part in 1872. From 1875 the Swedish State Railways were building Norrland Crossline, which opened 1879 between Torpshammar and Östersund. Before 1881 it had no connection to the rest of Sweden (only steamboat from Sundsvall), until the railway between Stockholm and Ånge was finished. At the same time, the governments were building a railway east from Trondheim, with the Government of Sweden building the Swedish part, finished 1882. The Government of Norway (Norway was in a union with Sweden at the time) built the Norwegian section, Meråker Line, which was opened in 1886. In 1885 the Sundsvall-Torpshammar Railway was bought by the state and rebuilt to standard gauge the following year. The railway was then known as the Norrland Crossline (Norrländska Tvärbanan) until it got the present name in the early 1990s. In November 2013 the railway had to be closed near the border because of the high risk of landslide, opened again February 2015. The place is 1 km (0.62 mi) from the border and named "Stora Helvetet" ("Big Hell", named after the troubles of building the railway here in 1877).
