= Ninetone Records =

Swedish record label

- Founded: 2006
- Founder: Patrik Frisk
- Distributor: Universal Music Group
- Genre: [All]
- Country of origin: SE
- Official website: www.ninetone.com

Ninetone Records is a Swedish record label, MCN, management and publisher based in Sundsvall, Sweden, with hits as their main focus. Ninetone Records has a substantial collection of platinum records and many Top 10 hits.

== History ==
Ninetone Records was launched in 2006 by the producer Patrik Frisk, and immediately hit the charts in Sweden with their debut release Takida – "...Make You Breathe", after that Ninetone Records has hit the chart's multiple times and after broadening their repertoire they have entered the Swedish contest Melodifestivalen with multiple artists. Ninetone Records distribution is through Universal Music Group for Sweden and GoodToGo for the rest of the world.

Ninetone started their influencer network and MCN department in 2015.

== Current and former artists ==
- April Divine (2006)
- Itchy Daze (2008–present)
- Norma Bates (2008–present)
- Takida (2006–2008)
- Corroded (2008–present)
- Plan Three (2009–2014)
- Seremedy (2011–2013)
- YOHIO (2011–2015)
- Solitude (2012–present)
- Joakim Lundell (2017–present)
- Tommy Nilsson (2017–present)
- Roger Pontare (2017–present)
- Lisa Ajax (2020–present)
- Harley Huke (2021-present)
- Dogma Society (2022-present)
- Lord Sinek (2022-present)
