= Takida =

Swedish rock band

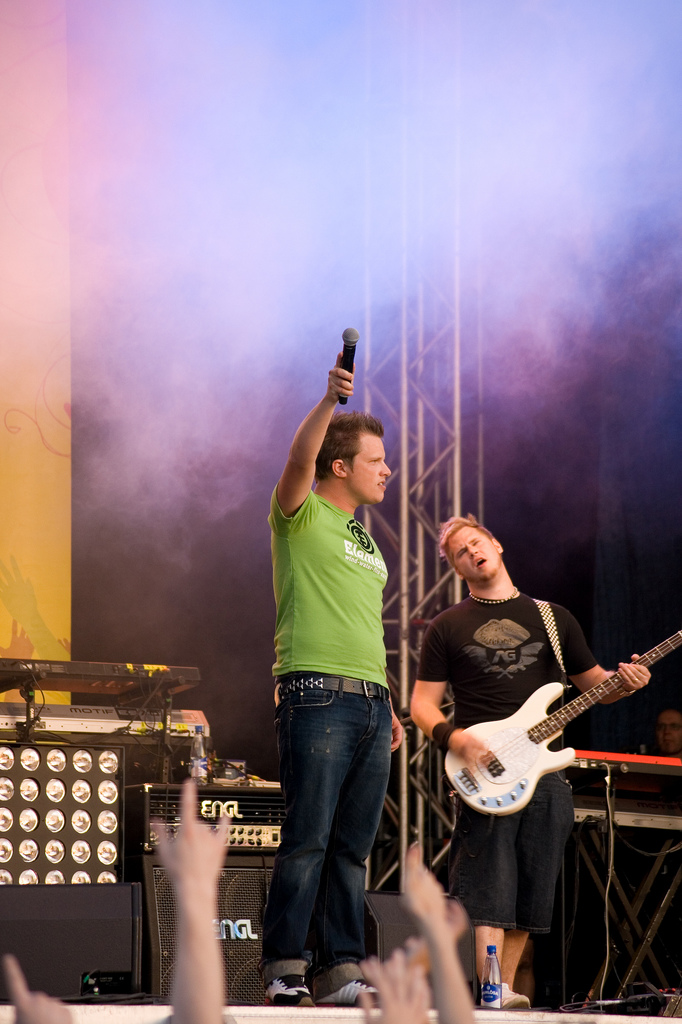

Background information
- Origin: Ånge, Sweden
- Genres: Post-grunge; alternative rock; pop rock
- Years active: 1999–present
- Members: Robert Petterson; Tomas Wallin; Mattias Larsson; Kristoffer Söderström; Chris Rehn
- Past members: Fredrik Holm; Roger Olsson; Niklas Källström; Fredrik Pålsson
- Website: takidamusic.com

Takida is a Swedish rock band from Ånge formed in 1999. The band's name comes from the character Gohee Takeda in the Japanese anime series Silver Fang. Takeda's name was mispronounced as "Takida" in the Swedish voiceover of the anime series.

== History ==
In 2000, they recorded their first demo, Old, in 2002, deadfrog records released played out 2 incorporating 2 tracks. in 2005 they were signed up by Swedish indie label Ninetone Records. They released their first single, "Losing", in January 2006 and in April 2006 their first album ...Make You Breathe was released. Their second album, Bury the Lies, was released in May 2007. The same year, the single "Curly Sue" topped radio channel P3s "Tracks" list for ten consecutive weeks. "Handlake village" and "The Things We Owe" also reached number one on the Tracks chart.

After the success of Bury the Lies, Takida received a number of offers from large labels but decided to turn them down and record their follow up album The Darker Instinct on their own label Takida AB. The album was released in September 2009.

On 18 August 2009, Takida announced that they had signed a contract with the global Roadrunner Records. The first release outside Scandinavia was Bury The Lies in Germany on 2 October.

During the fall of 2009 Takida supported Theory of a Dead Man for their four German shows and were the supporting act for The Butterfly Effect when they toured Germany during the winter of 2009. During this period they had their first headlining tour in Sweden.

On 28 September 2012, they released a new single, "Swallow (Until You're Gone)", the first single of their greatest hits album A Lesson Learned – The Best Of. The album was released in late 2012.

On 7 January 2014, the first single from their album All Turns Red was released. The song's name is One Lie, the new album was released in March.

== Dreamstate ==
Band members Tomas Wallin and Chris Rehn also started the project Dreamstate, with Elize Ryd (Amaranthe) and Tommy Levin providing vocals. So far, they've only released 2 singles; "Evolution" and "Washed Away".

=== Evolution ===
The song "Evolution" is the official track for the Rally car driver Ramona Karlsson and her 2012 world rally championship effort, sponsored by Mitsubishi and Höganäs. The music video was released on January 31, 2012. An alternative version, with Chris Rehn's daughter (Zaga Rehn) providing all the vocals, was released as well. It came out on February 23, 2012.

=== Washed Away ===
The song "Washed Away" was released, on August 12, 2022. Aside from Ryd and Levin providing clean vocals, it's the first time that band member Tomas Wallin provides (growled and clean) vocals. Zaga Rehn also appears in the video.

== Members ==
Current members

- Robert Pettersson – vocals
- Tomas Wallin – guitars
- Mattias Larsson – guitars
- Kristoffer Söderström – drums
- Chris Rehn – bass, keyboards, cello, violin

Former members

- Roger Olsson – guitars
- Niklas Källström – drums
- Fredrik Holm – drums
- Fredrik Pålsson – bass

== Discography ==
Studio albums

- ...Make You Breathe (2006)
- Bury the Lies (2007)
- The Darker Instinct (2009)
- The Burning Heart (2011)
- A Lesson Learned – The Best Of (2012)
- All Turns Red (2014)
- A Perfect World (2016)
- Sju (2019)
- The Demo Days (2020)
- Falling from Fame (2021)
- The Agony Flame (2024)
- Numbers (2027)
