= Håkvik Chapel =

Church in Nordland, Norway

- Håkvik kapell
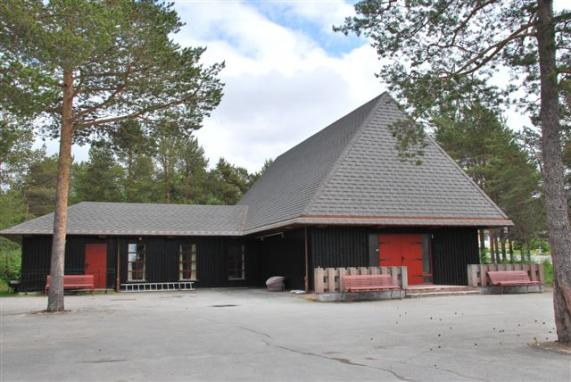
- View of the church
- Håkvik Chapel
- 68.40461663°N 17.3112224°E
- Location: Narvik Municipality, Nordland
- Country: Norway
- Denomination: Church of Norway
- Churchmanship: Evangelical Lutheran

History
- Status: Parish church
- Founded: 1980
- Consecrated: 1980

Architecture
- Functional status: Active
- Architect: Einar Karstad
- Architectural type: Long church
- Completed: 1980 (46 years ago)

Specifications
- Capacity: 180
- Materials: Wood

Administration
- Diocese: Sør-Hålogaland
- Deanery: Ofoten prosti
- Parish: Ankenes

Håkvik Chapel (Norwegian: Håkvik kapell) is a parish church of the Church of Norway in Narvik Municipality in Nordland county, Norway. It is located in the village of Håkvik. It is one of the churches for the Ankenes parish which is part of the Ofoten prosti (deanery) in the Diocese of Sør-Hålogaland. The brown, wooden church was built in a long church style in 1980 using plans drawn up by the architect Einar Karstad. The church seats about 180 people.

== See also ==
- List of churches in Sør-Hålogaland
