= Per Geijer =

Swedish geologist, mineralogist, and professor

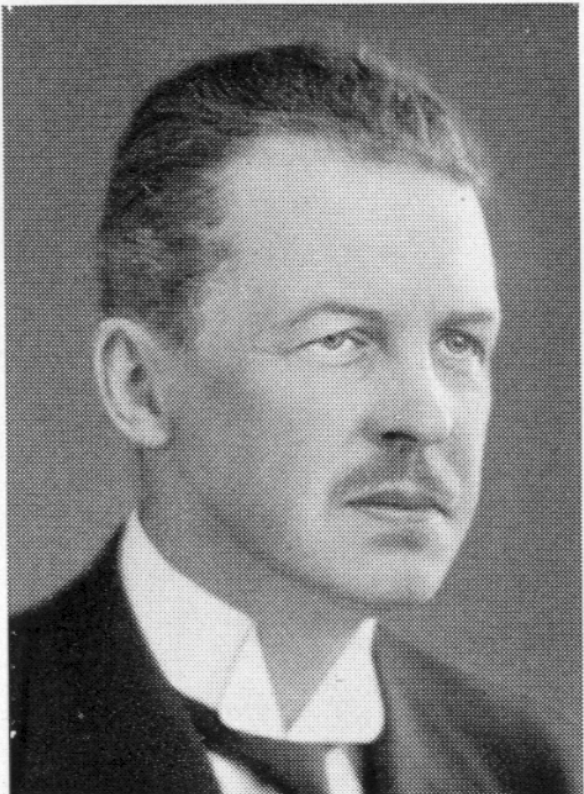
- Born: 7 May 1886; Svealand, Sweden
- Died: 18 April 1976 (aged 89); Danderyd, Sweden
- Family: Geijer family
- Awards: Brinell Medal

Academic work
- Discipline: geology
- Sub-discipline: mineralogy
- Institutions: Stockholm University; Swedish Geological Survey
- Main interests: Sweden's ores

Per Adolf Geijer (7 May 1886 in Svealand – 18 April 1976 in Danderyd) was a Swedish geologist, mineralogist, and professor. He was a member of the Geijer family (son of Gottschalk Geijer, grandson of Per Adolf Geijer, and grandfather of Per Olof Nisser).

Geijer received his doctoral degree and was named as an associate professor of petrography at Stockholm University in 1910. He undertook a trip to North America in 1913 to study mining operations there and in 1916 became a state geologist at the Swedish Geological Survey (SGU). He was professor of mineralogy and geology at the Royal Institute of Technology from 1931 to 1941 and director general and head of SGU from 1942 to 1951.

His works dealt mainly with Sweden's ores and the geological conditions under which they occur. His works deal with the ore fields at Kirunavaara, Luossavaara, Tuollavaara and in Falutrakten.

Geijer was elected in 1934 as a member of the Royal Swedish Academy of Engineering Sciences and in 1939 became a member of the Royal Swedish Academy of Sciences. He was elected to the (American) National Academy of Sciences in 1958, and awarded the Brinell Medal in 1961 together with Nils H. Magnusson.

The mineral perite, discovered in Långban, Sweden in 1960, was named in his honor.

== See also ==
- Dollaseite-(Ce) – a mineral discovered by Geijer

== Sources ==
- Geijer, Per in Nordisk familjebok (second edition supplement, 1923)
- Geijer, Per in Vem är det 1943

=== Notes ===
Preceded by Axel Gavelin	Director general Swedish Geological Survey; 1942–1951	Succeeded by Nils H. Magnusson
