= Krekula =

Krekula is a Swedish surname. Notable people with the surname include:

- Fredrik Krekula (born 1974), Swedish ice hockey winger
- Simon Krekula (born 1998), Swedish ice hockey forward
