= Kiruna Church =

Church in Sweden

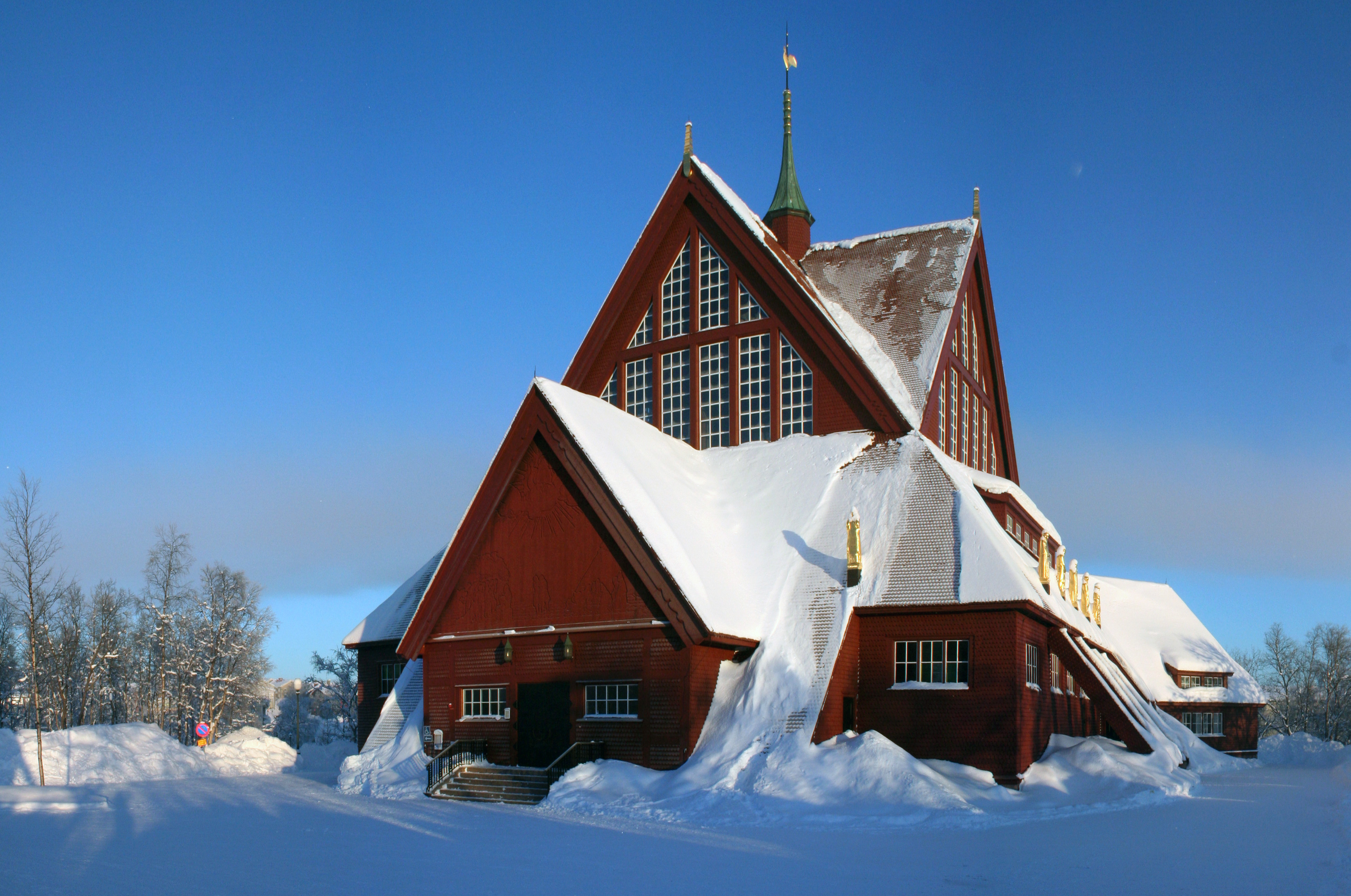
- Kiruna Church in 2011
- Kiruna Church
- 67°51′7.2″N 20°13′58.7″E
- Location: Kiruna
- Country: Sweden
- Denomination: Church of Sweden

History
- Consecrated: 8 December 1912

Administration
- Diocese: Luleå
- Parish: Jukkasjärvi

Kiruna Church (Swedish: Kiruna kyrka) is a church building in Kiruna, Sweden, and is one of Sweden's largest wooden buildings. The church was built between 1909 and 1912, designed by the architect Gustaf Wickman. The church exterior is built in a Gothic Revival style, while the altar is in Art Nouveau. The church was moved during two days in August 2025 a distance of 5 kilometres (3.1 mi) to the east due to subsidence from the Kiruna mine.

== History ==
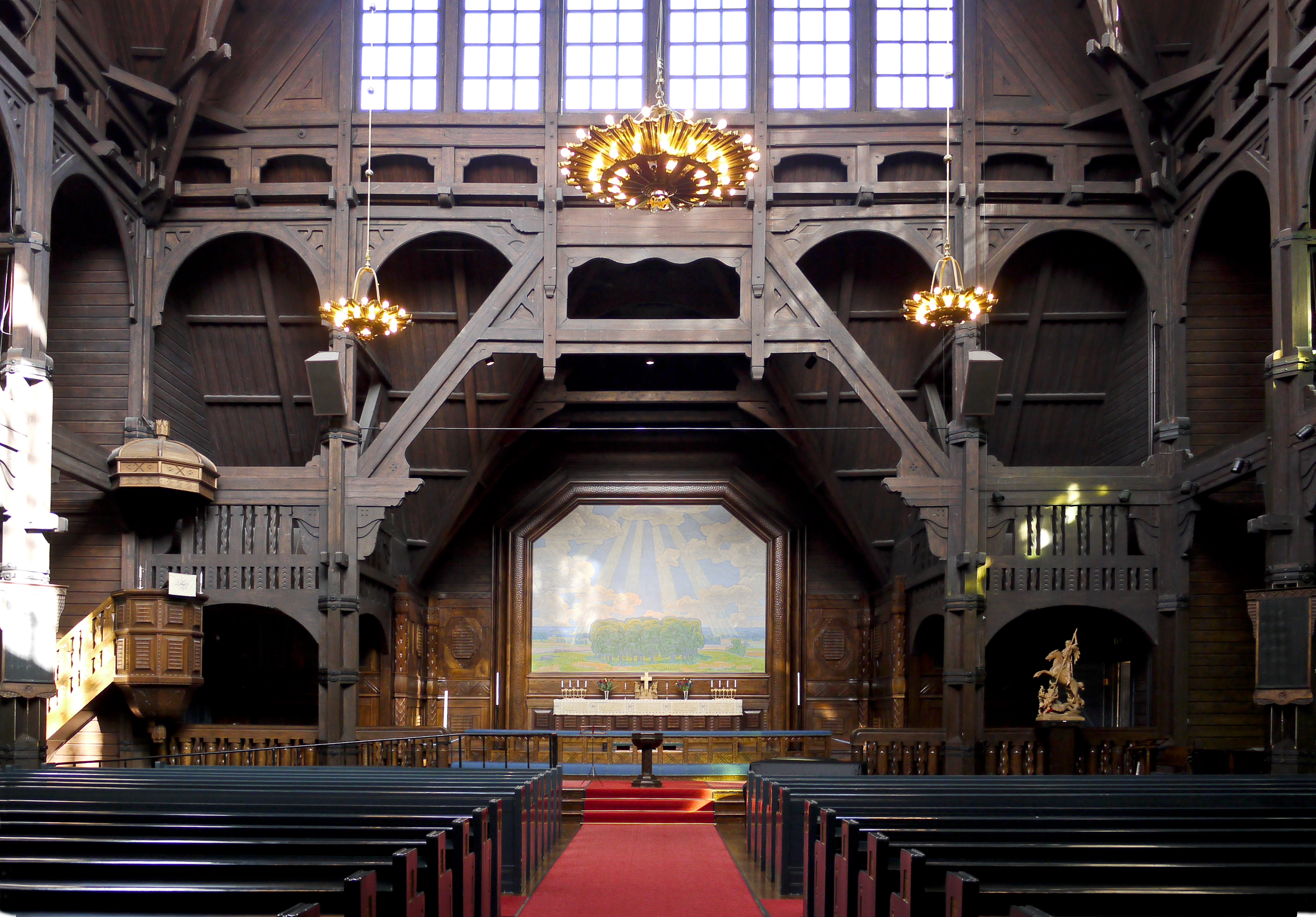
Interior of the church.

The church was built between 1909 and 1912, and consecrated by Bishop Olof Bergqvist on 8 December 1912. Since 1913, the church has been included in the Jukkasjärvi parish in the diocese of Luleå. Gustaf Wickman was the church's architect and the famous altarpiece is a work of Prince Eugen, Duke of Närke.

Gustaf Wickman moved to Kiruna in 1899. Hjalmar Lundbohm, manager of LKAB and founder of the community, commissioned Wickman to design the church and town. The construction was primarily funded by LKAB Mining company. In order to ensure that everyone felt welcome in the church, Lundbohm did not use many symbols associated with Christianity. Bishop Olof Bergqvist, however, requested that the church be officially affiliated with Christianity. The Swedish sculptor Christian Eriksson made one cross for the entire building as a compromise.

In 2001, Kiruna Church was voted the most popular pre-1950 building in Sweden, in a country-wide poll conducted by the Swedish Travelling Exhibitions, a government agency connected to the Ministry of Culture. It is considered to be "the Shrine of the Nomadic people."

=== Relocation of the church ===
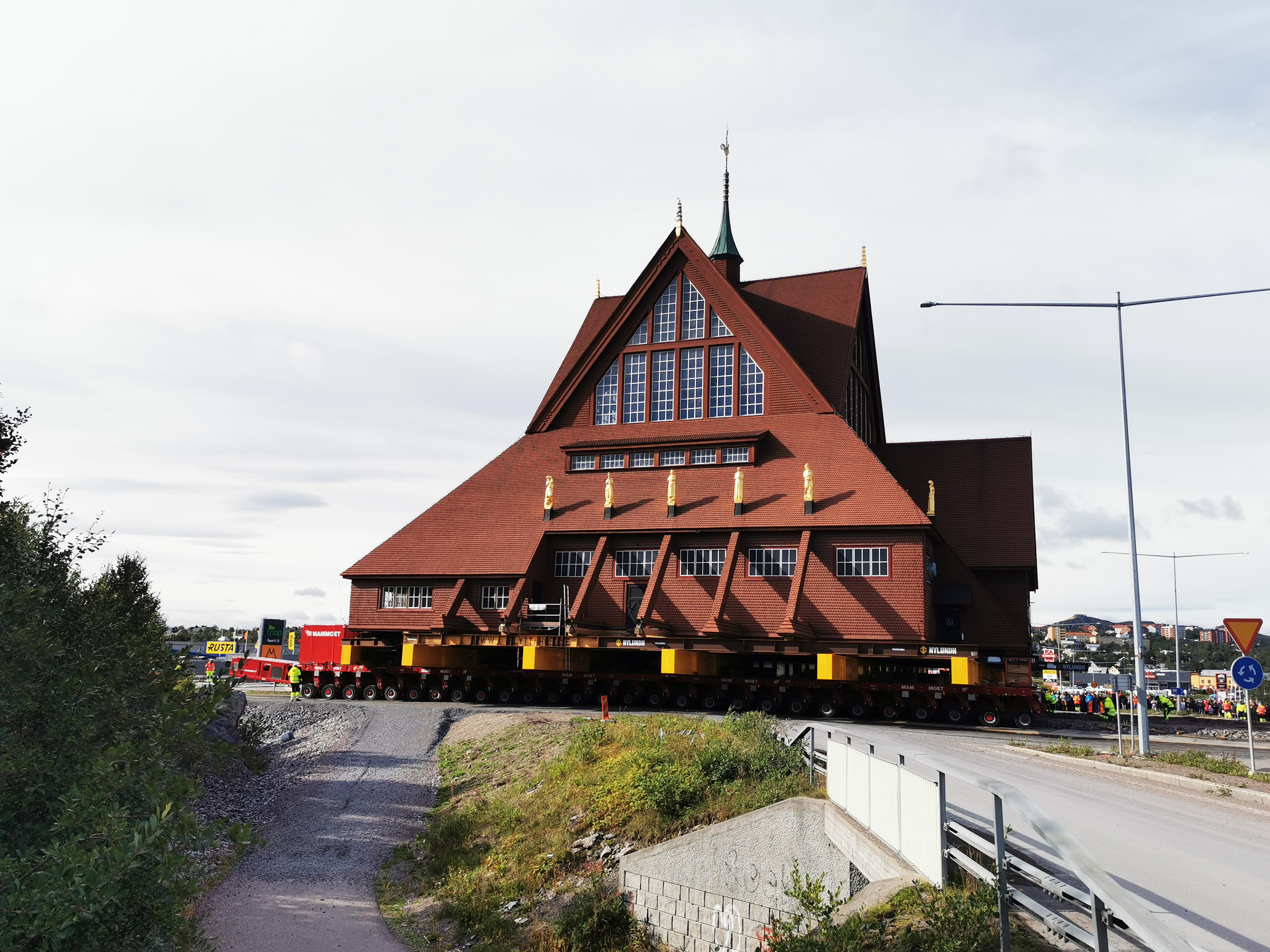
The church during the move.

In August 2025, due to the expansion of the Kiruna Mine, the church was moved to a location adjacent to the cemetery a distance of about 5 kilometres (3.1 mi). The 40×40×37 meter, 672.4 ton church was moved to its current location by two 28-axle SPMTs (48 ton capacity per axle) over two days, 19-20 August 2025. It was broadcast live by Sveriges Television as slow TV. News of the move was reported by international press, including the BBC, The Guardian, and the Financial Times, and The Wall Street Journal published a feature article with photography by Klaus Thymann. The move was performed by Dutch transport firm Mammoet.

== Church building ==
Kiruna Church is one of Sweden's largest wooden buildings. The church's design has been significantly influenced by Sami huts and Norwegian stave churches. The building's exterior is neo-Gothic, the interior has national romanticism elements, and the altarpiece is Art Nouveau. Kiruna Church's plan was made up of simple forms in geometry. The building's plan displayed an open and spacious square design, with elevated and symmetrical triangular forms.

=== Exterior ===
Kiruna Church reflects the possibilities of the carpentry industry by expressing elements of the Shingle style. As the church is covered with continuous wooden shingle cladding, the walls and the roof have a similar appearance. The roof of the building almost stretches down to the ground and is ornamented by twelve gilded, cast bronze figures by the sculptor Christian Eriksson which depict twelve different emotional states.

=== Interior ===
Kiruna Church has a main nave and two side naves, with elaborate designed dormers. The main room of the church possesses gable windows, which provide plenty of natural light for the inside space. Colored panes towards the lower part of the interior creates a shady, obscure environment by the side aisles because it reduces the amount of light entering the space. Sámi ornamentation influenced the intricate woodwork and carved latticework of the choir design. Christian Eriksson made free-standing wooden sculptures for the interior of the building, which remain in place.

A large altarpiece called "The Holy Grove" was created by Prince Eugen for the church's interior. The focal point of the painting is a depiction of a vast, limitless landscape.

=== Belfry ===
Built earlier than the church, the bell tower was constructed in 1906–1907. The tower stood before the move about twenty meters to the west of the main church building and reflects influence from other bell towers in northern Sweden. The materials and color of the tower are the same as Kiruna Church.
