= Kauppinen =

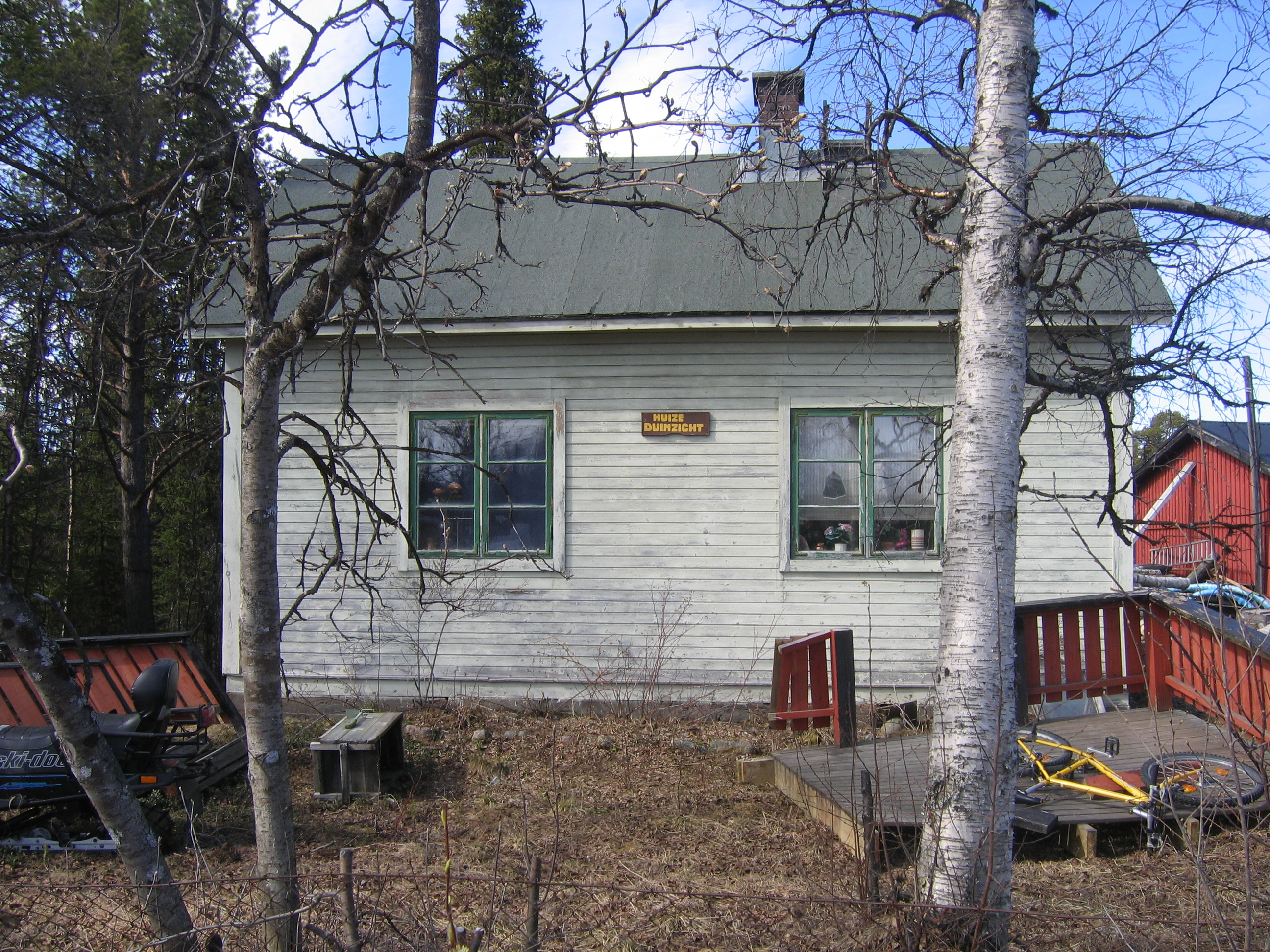
- House in Kauppinen in spring

- Location within Norrbotten Location within Sweden
- Coordinates: 67°51′N 20°29′E
- Country: Sweden
- Province: Lappland
- County: Norrbotten County
- Municipality: Kiruna Municipality

Area
  - Total: 0.26 km^{2} (0.10 sq mi)
- Elevation: 390 m (1,280 ft)

Population (2005-12-31)
  - Total: 66
  - Density: 253/km^{2} (660/sq mi)
- Time zone: UTC+1 (CET)
  - Summer (DST): UTC+2 (CEST)

Kauppinen is a village around 8 km (5.0 mi) east of Kiruna in Kiruna Municipality, Norrbotten County, Sweden with 66 inhabitants in 2005. It lies close to the European route E10.
