= Kiruna =

Mining city in northern Sweden

Kiruna Giron (Northern Sami) Kieruna (Meänkieli) Kiiruna (Finnish)
- Kiruna - Giron
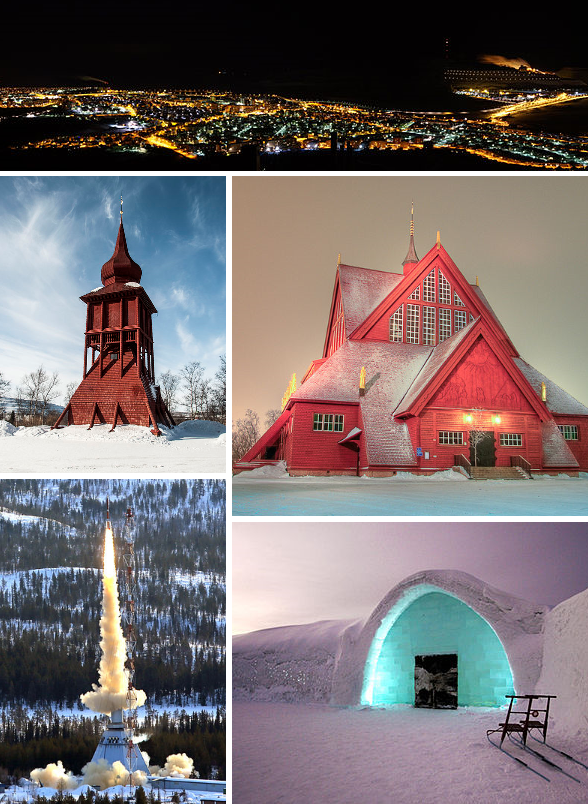
- Clockwise from top: Kiruna skyline by night, Kiruna Church, the Icehotel in Jukkasjärvi, rocket launch at Esrange, bell tower at Kiruna Church.

- Location within Norrbotten Location within Sweden Location within European Union
- Coordinates: 67°50′56″N 20°18′10″E
- Country: Sweden
- Province: Lapland
- County: Norrbotten County
- Municipality: Kiruna Municipality
- City plan adopted: 27 April 1900
- Charter: 1 January 1948

Area
  - Total: 19,447 km^{2} (7,509 sq mi)

Population (30 September 2019)
  - Total: 22,906
  - Density: 1,098/km^{2} (2,840/sq mi)
- Time zone: UTC+1 (CET)
  - Summer (DST): UTC+2 (CEST)
- Website: kiruna.se

Kiruna (Swedish: [ˈkǐːrʉna]; Northern Sami: Giron [ˈkiron]; Finnish: Kiiruna [ˈkiːrunɑ]; Meänkieli: Kieruna) is the northernmost city in Sweden, situated in the province of Lapland. It had 17,002 inhabitants in 2016 and is the seat of Kiruna Municipality (population: 23,167 in 2016) in Norrbotten County. The city was originally built in the 1890s to serve the Kiruna mine.

The Esrange space center was established in Kiruna in the 1960s. Also in Kiruna are the Institute of Space Physics and Luleå University of Technology's Department of Space Science.

== History ==
=== Origins ===
Archaeological findings have shown that the region around Kiruna has been inhabited for at least 6,000 years.

Centuries before Kiruna was founded in 1900, the presence of iron ore at Kiirunavaara and Luossavaara had been known by the local Sámi population. In 1696, Samuel Mört, a bookkeeper of the Kengis works, wrote on rumours about the presence of iron in the two hills. The ore became better known after it was reported by Mangi, a Sámi man, in 1736 to Swedish authorities that had gathered in Jukkasjärvi Church. Soon after the reported finding Swedish senior enforcement officer and cartographer Anders Hackzell mapped the Kiruna area in 1736. He named the mountains Fredriks berg and Berget Ulrika Eleonora, after the King of Sweden Fredrik I and his wife Ulrika Eleonora, though today the mountains are known only by the names Kirunavaara and Luossavaara which come from Meänkieli.

Despite the findings of large amounts of ore, no mining was initiated because of the remote location and the harsh climate. Some ore was extracted in the 19th century. It was extracted in summer and transported in winter, using sleds drawn by reindeer and horses. However, the costs were high and the quality of the phosphorus ore poor, until, in 1878, the Gilchrist–Thomas process, invented by Sidney Gilchrist Thomas and Percy Gilchrist, allowed for the separation of phosphorus from the ore.

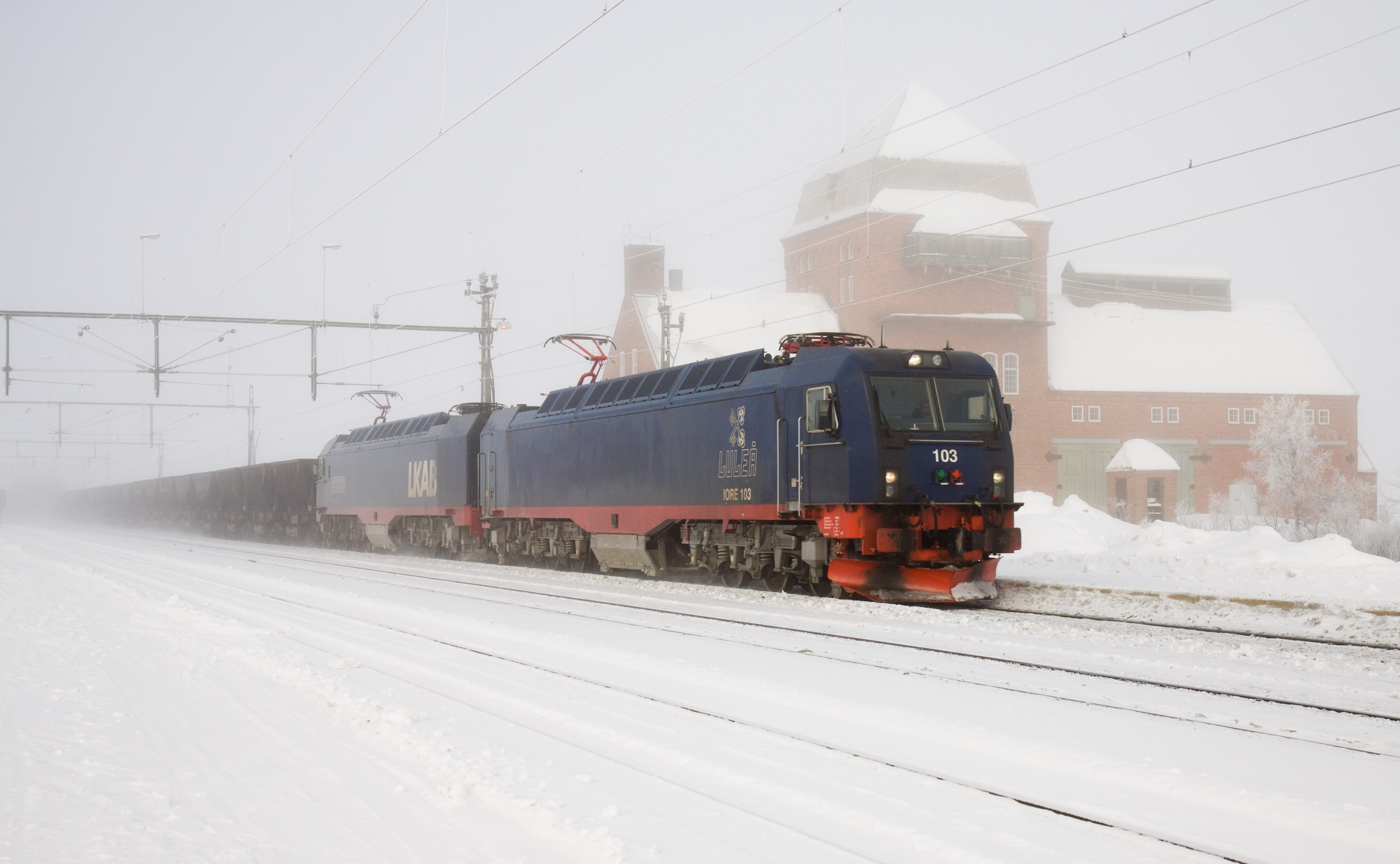
An Iore electric locomotive passing Vassijaure

In 1884, a concession for a railway from Luleå to Narvik was granted to The Northern Europe Railway Company. The provisional railway between Luleå and Malmberget was finished in 1888 and the first train left Malmberget in March. Around the same time, the English company went bankrupt and had to sell the line to the Swedish state for 8 million Swedish crowns, around half the amount initially invested. After a significant rebuild, the railway to Gällivare could be used again and iron ore was extracted at Malmberget by Aktiebolaget Gellivare Malmfält (AGM).

At the initiative of Robert Schoug, the Luossavaara-Kiirunavaara Aktiebolag (LKAB) was founded in 1890. In 1893, Gustaf Broms became CEO of both LKAB and AGM. LKAB pressed for continuing Malmbanan via Luossavaara and Kiirunavaara to the ice-free coast of Norway. The continuation of the railway line to Narvik was controversial, because opponents feared the influence of Russia (then controlling Finland and already connected to Sweden at Haparanda–Tornio) on an international railway line.

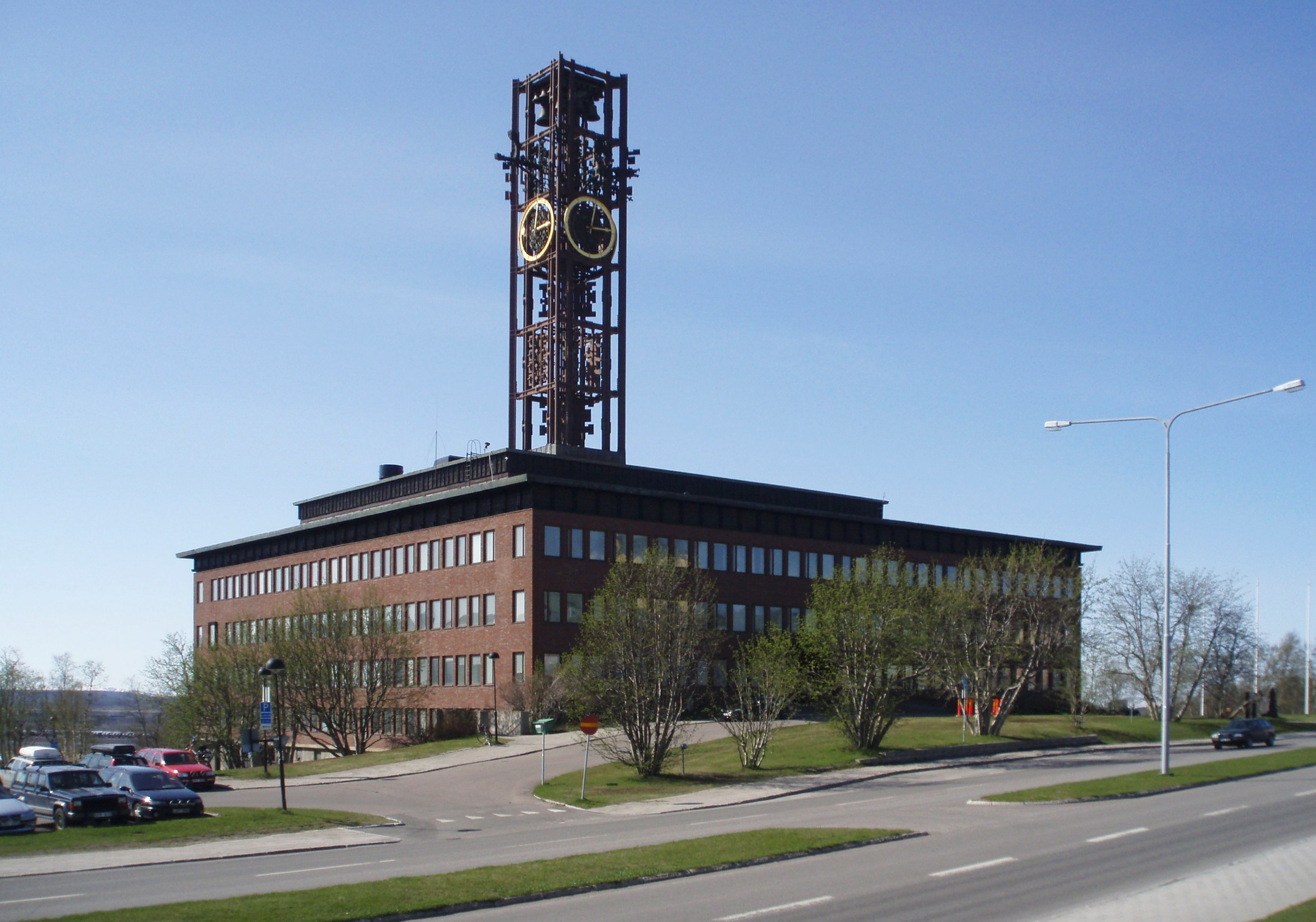
The old Kiruna City Hall in summer

The decision to build was finally taken in 1898. The railway came to Kiruna 15 October 1899 and the Swedish and Norwegian sections were joined 15 November 1902. For LKAB, the great expense almost led to bankruptcy in 1901, just after the ore mining at Kiirunavaara had started. King Oscar II only opened the railway line 14 July 1903, preferring summer over winter to travel north.

The architects Per Olof Hallman and Gustaf Wickman were appointed to design the city, to be built at Haukivaara, near both iron ore mines, with then-revolutionary consideration of geographical and climatological circumstances; being built on a hill, winter temperatures are much milder than in other towns, and due to the street plan and the positioning, wind is limited. On 27 April 1900, Hallman's plan was officially accepted.

Gustaf Broms proposed to name the settlements Kiruna, a short and practical name that could also be pronounced by Swedish-speaking inhabitants. The name means rock ptarmigan in Sámi and Finnish. LKAB appointed Hjalmar Lundbohm, who had finished neither high school nor his geology studies, as local manager in Kiruna.

=== Early history ===
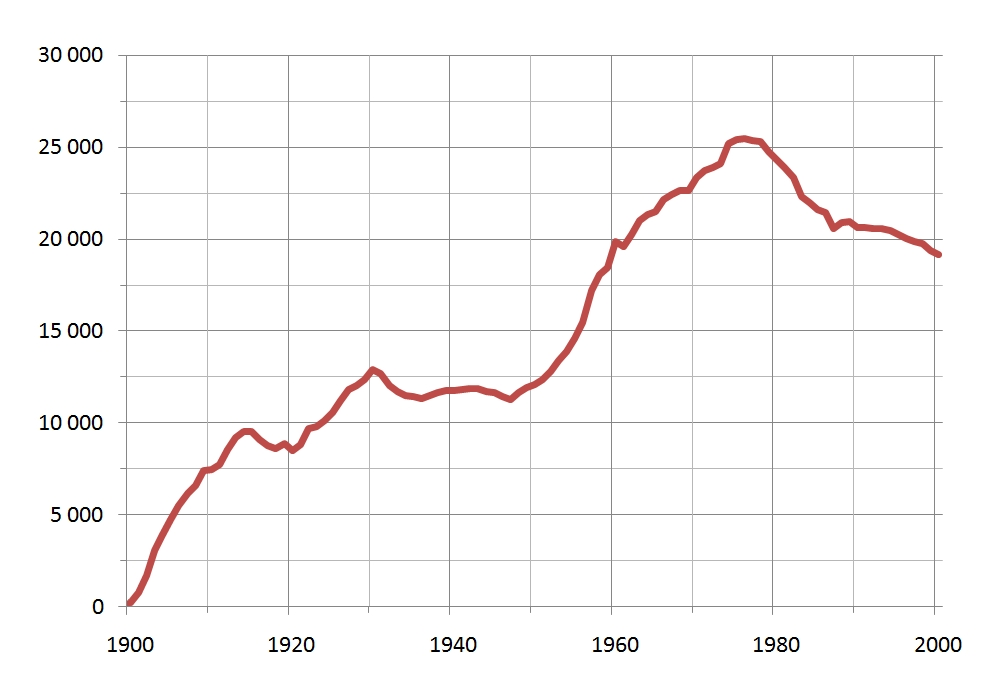
Population development in Kiruna town

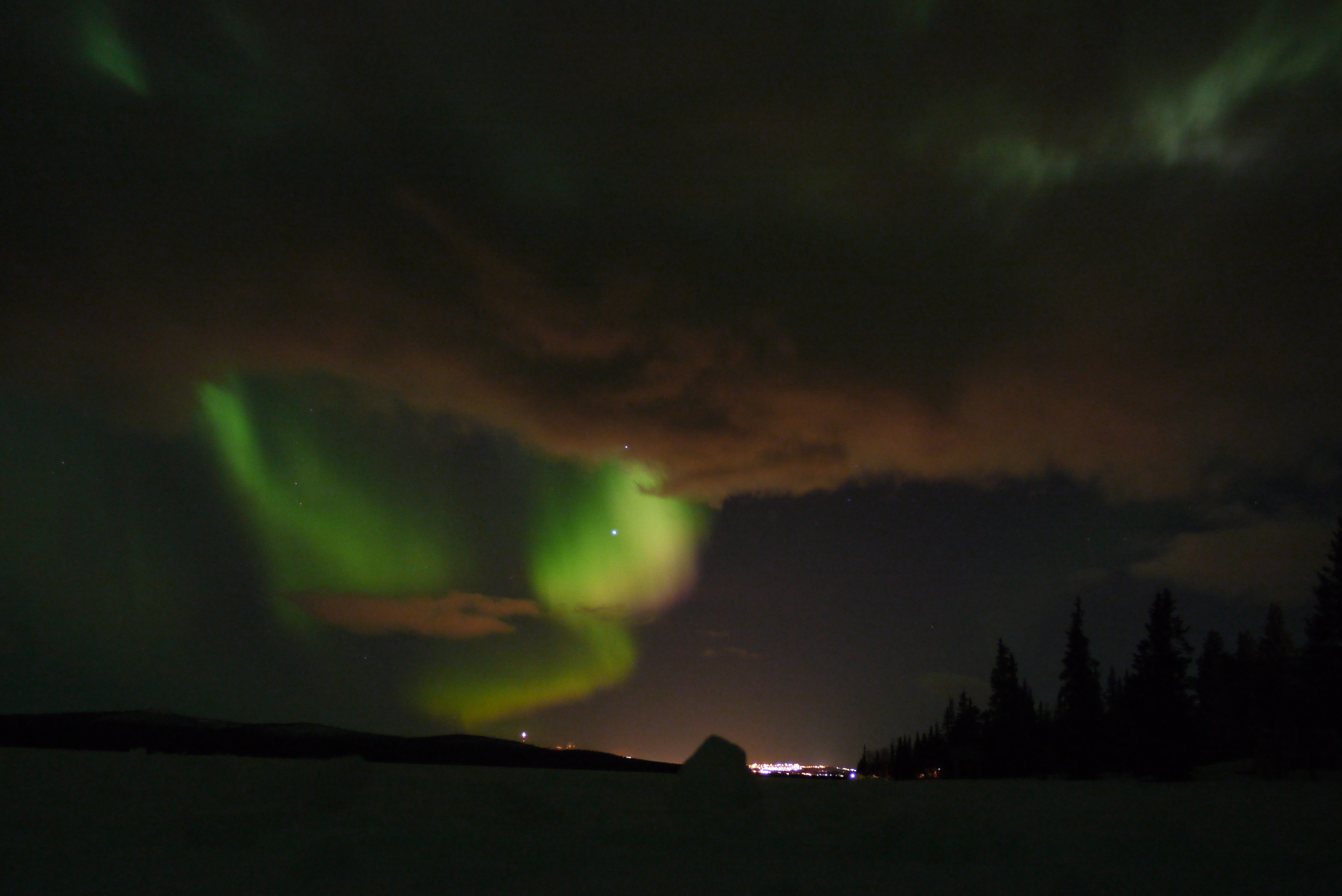
Aurora taken from the suburbs of Kiruna

Before the design for the settlement had been accepted, houses were built in a disorganized manner with illegal slums similar to those in the other mining town, Malmberget, 80 kilometres (50 mi) south of Kiruna. Also, provisional buildings served as a church, a school, a hospital, a hotel and a police station. However, official residences were built at a high pace, and when the king opened the railway in 1903, all illegal residences and most other provisional buildings had been demolished and replaced. The very first building, B:1, is preserved and can be seen at Hjalmar Lundbohmsgården. In 1899, 18 people were registered as living in soon-to-be Kiruna. This increased to 222 in 1900, 7,438 in 1910 and 12,884 in 1930.

The residences did not fully keep up with this rapid growth; by 1910, there were 1,877 official rooms and some unrecognised residences, which meant that an average of three to four people lived in a single room; this density decreased steadily during the decades to follow. Kiruna became a municipalsamhälle (a community within a municipality) in 1908. This caused unhappiness in local organisations, such as Luossavaara-Kiirunavaara Arbetareförening, that had hoped for status as köping, which would have kept more of the mining income inside the locality. In return, the mining company LKAB paid for a hospital, fire station, sewerage, roads, a church (opened 1912) and the priest's home.

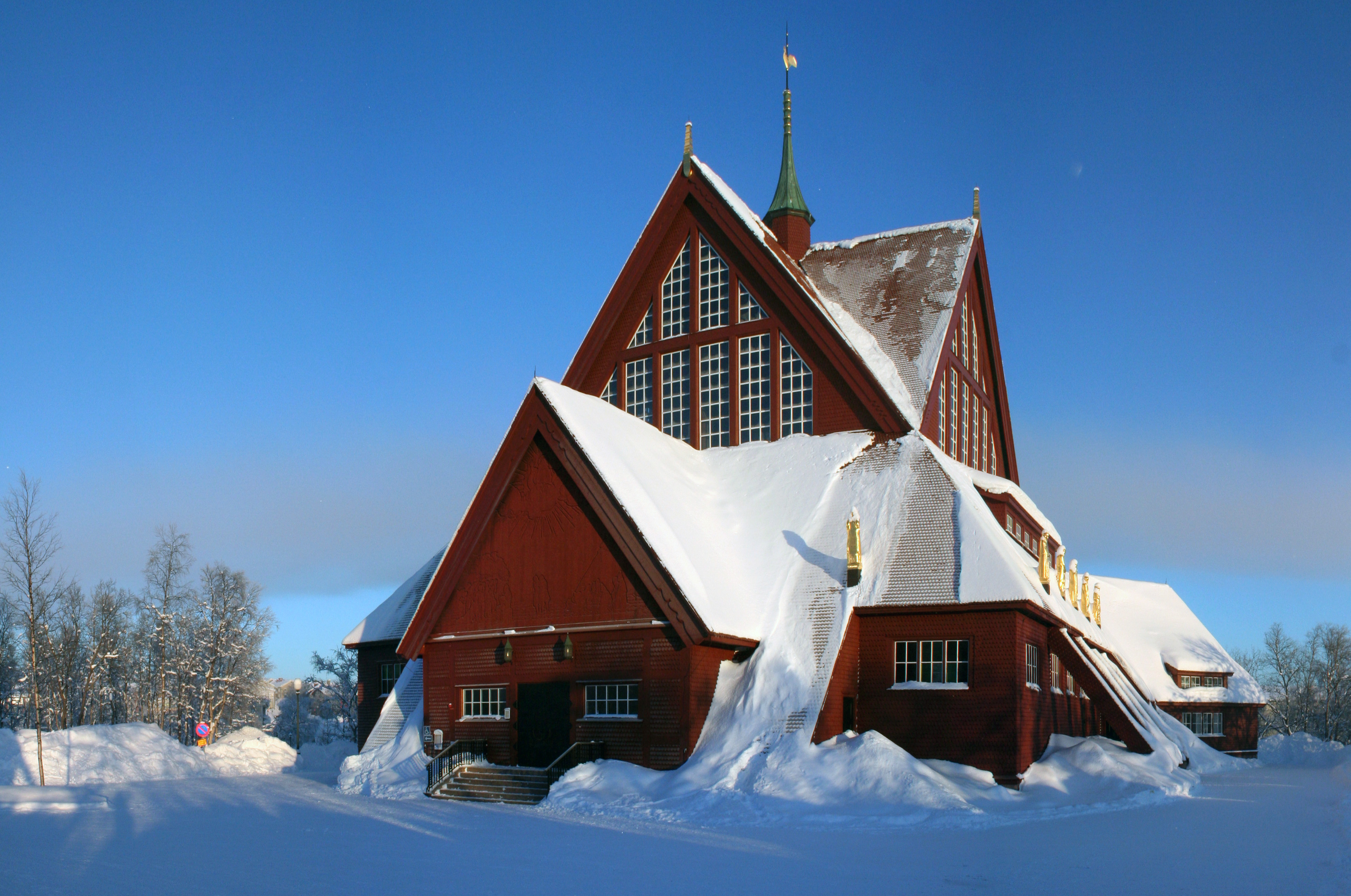
Kiruna Church

In April 1907, a tram began operation in Kiruna, the northernmost in the world. This meant miners would no longer have to walk several kilometres through the sub-arctic cold, nor would they need to climb a hundred meters up the mining hill. The network consisted of three lines: bergbanan (funicular), stadsspårvägen (city tramway) and gruvspårvägen (mine tramway). The funicular closed in 1955 after a road up the mine was built 1949. The city line had a maximum length of 8 kilometres (5.0 mi) and was unique due to the 1-meter gauge, double-glazed windows and heated wagons. It closed in 1958 after gradually being replaced by buses. Between 1941 and 1964, a tram was used inside the mine, with wagons bought from closed tramlines throughout Sweden.

The iron ore industry was good in the early 20th century. Before the start of the work, Hjalmar Lundbohm worried whether the Kiruna winter would allow for working outside at all, but despite early research into underground mining, mountaintop removal mining was the primary method in the early years. Mechanisation was attempted early using steam powered excavators, but the cold climate led to considerable difficulties and only when electrical machinery became available in the 1910s, significant mechanisation was achieved. The peak of Kiirunavaara, Statsrådet, was 247.7 metres (813 ft) above Luossajärvi until it was spectacularly blown off in 1910.

A general strike hit Sweden in 1909 and Kiruna was no exception. Hoping for a better future, thousands of people left Kiruna, including a group of 500 inhabitants emigrating to Brazil. Most of them returned, disappointed that life in Latin America was not what they had hoped it to be. Hjalmar Lundbohm personally lent money for the trip home to some of the emigrants.

During World War I, iron ore production dropped to the lowest level in LKAB's history, and when exports increased again, a successful three-month strike in 1920 led to a 20% increase in salaries for the miners. Production dropped to a minimum in 1922 and a three-day work week was introduced, but during the fabulous twenties, it increased to a record nine million tonnes in 1927.

In 1921, mining started at Kiruna's other hill, Luossavaara. However, the total amount of ore that could be mined in open pit mining here was small compared to Kiirunavaara, and LKAB preferred to concentrate resources in one place. Nevertheless, mining here continued until 1974 and later it became a research mine. While 19th-century mining in Kiruna had focused on Luossavaara the large-scale operation of LKAB focused on the Kiruna ore proper because it was both larger and not subject to legal restrictions that mandate Luossavaara ore to be refined in Sweden.

During the first decades of Kiruna's existence, no road connected it to the outside world. The only connection was by railway or, as in the time before the railway, by boat (in summer) via the Torne and Kalix rivers to Jukkasjärvi and Håmojåkk and then proceeding by foot. A road from Kiruna was built to Tuolluvaara in 1901, Poikkijärvi in 1909, Alttajärvi in 1913 and connected to Svappavaara in 1926, from where roads already connected via Vittangi to Pajala and via Lappesuando to Gällivare and further south.

The Great Depression led to a 70% drop in ore production, a drop that would turn into a dramatic increase on the eve of World War II.

Although some tourists had already started coming to the area in the 19th century, the completion of the railway line truly made tourism possible. Tourists came for the rivers and the mountains, but also geologists and entire classes of students came to see the mine. Additionally, a yearly winter sports festival was started, which attracted people from a wide area. The Sami population was already a tourist attraction in the early days of Kiruna's existence.

In the early 1920s a movement that became known as "Kirunasvenskarna" (the Kiruna Swedes) decided to emigrate to Soviet Russia, the land where they hoped for better working conditions and higher wages and general standards. They were the last Swedes who emigrated in groups. Most of these emigrants lived in Kiruna prior to their move.

=== World War II ===
The municipality of Kiruna shares borders with Norway and Finland and Kiruna is located relatively close to both countries. This led to many soldiers being transported to the area whenever mobilisation was requested; first in September 1939 after the German invasion of Poland, then in November 1939 after the Russian invasion of Finland, but in both cases, Swedish soldiers did not engage in any fighting. In March 1940, Churchill requested permission to transport soldiers from Narvik in Norway to Finland via Kiruna and Haparanda in Operation Catherine. Out of fear that the presence of British soldiers near the Kiruna ore mine would provoke a German attack on Sweden, the request was declined.

After the German invasion of Norway, at least ten soldiers were stationed along every bridge along Malmbanan, to blow up the bridges should the German army invade Sweden. Additionally, foreigners were banned from visiting Kiruna or the iron ore line, and only the Sami, military personnel, locals and people working for the government were permitted to travel between Kiruna and Riksgränsen.

After the battle at Bjørnfjell, 15 April 1940, wounded and fallen Norwegian soldiers were transported to Kiruna.

Despite the conditions for Swedish neutrality, rail cars with food, skis and helmets were transported from Kiruna to the Norwegian soldiers in Bjørnfjell.

Swedish iron ore from Kiruna was of major importance to the German war machine. A group of people working at LKAB organised in the Wollweberliga, planning to sabotage transports to Germany. In late November 1941, Edvard Nyberg, Ernst Wollweber and others produced a mine to be attached to the ore cars. Nyberg was caught, was fired from LKAB and spent 3 1/2 years in prison. Upon his release, he founded Nybergs Mekaniska Verkstad which is still one of Kiruna's biggest companies.

Germany requested that Sweden provide use of the railway network to transport military equipment, but the Swedish government agreed only to transitering av human karaktär, men ej underhåll till stridande trupp (transit of humanitarian character, but no supply of fighting soldiers). Germany argued that, now that Norway was occupied, the German soldiers there were no longer fighting, and thus transported a large amount of military equipment, ammunition and, secretly, troops from southern to northern Norway, via Malmbanan and Kiruna. Troops were often transported in transports declared as material transports. Despite being strictly against the rules, there was considerable interaction between the German soldiers and the Swedish locals, including trading and football matches.

During the war, up to 2,000 refugees from 20 countries were kept in Kiruna. German prisoners of war, for example, from crashed airplanes, were kept in Kiruna before being transported south. However, small-scale sabotage, such as sand in the engines, was common and loose weapons often ended up at the bottom of the Luossajärvi lake, next to the railway stop.

North of Torneträsk, at Kaivare, a radio base Kari was built in secrecy and used by the Norwegian resistance. It was also used for the smuggling of arms to Norway and refugees from Norway.

=== Post-war ===
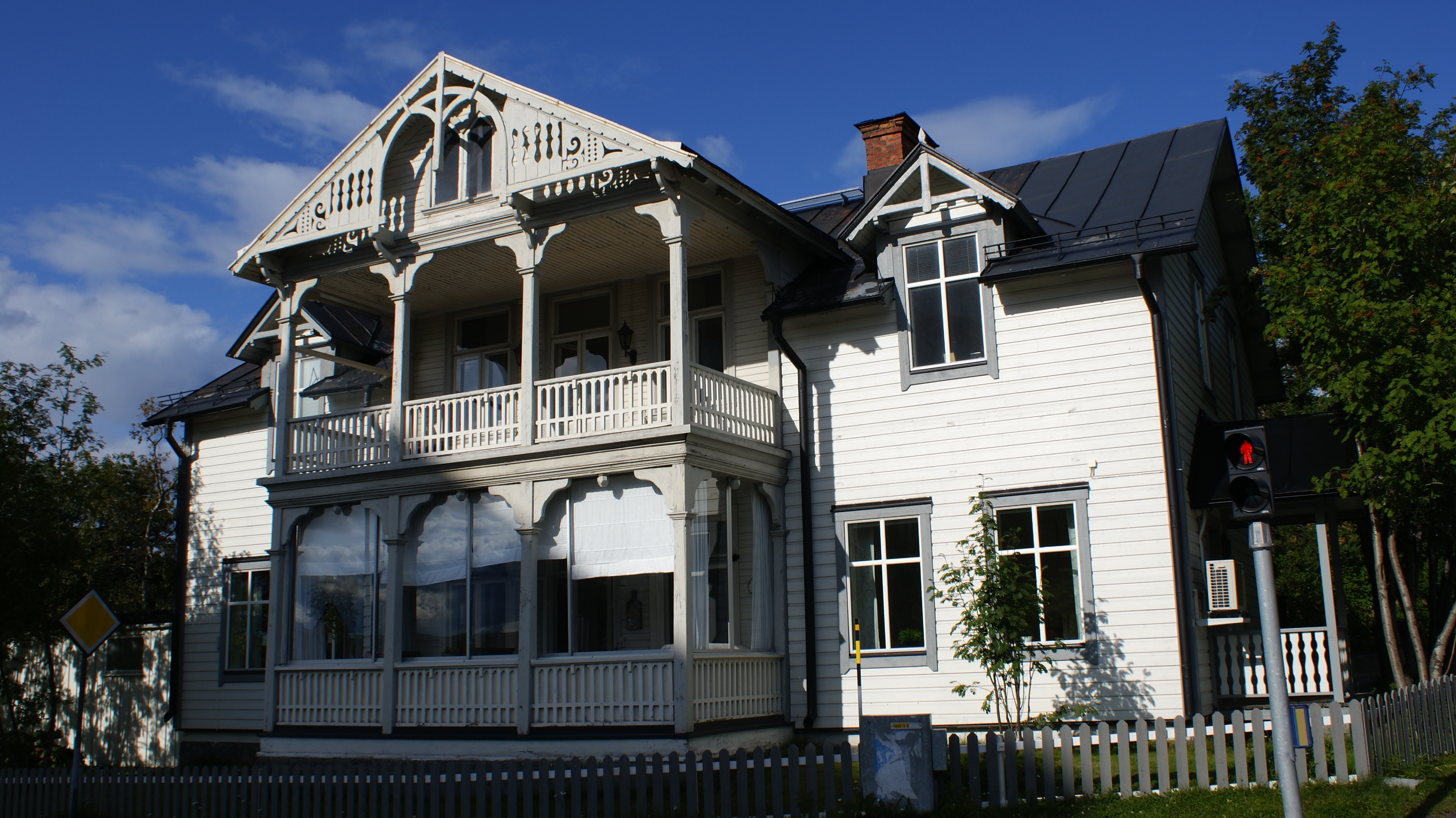
An old mansion near the centre of Kiruna.

In 1948, Kiruna gained city rights and started to receive large amounts of money from the mine. The city centre was renovated starting in 1953; most buildings built before 1920 were demolished and replaced, and many of the buildings built in the following period lasted into the 2000s. The town grew and new neighborhoods were built, as well as new apartment buildings and villas in existing neighborhoods. The area is known as Lombolo and was built in the 1960s.

After World War II, the economy of Kiruna started to diversify. Initially, the mechanisation of the mining industry led to more mechanical workshops developing machinery for the mine, still dependent on the mining, but individual companies with spinoffs that could be sold to other areas than the Kiruna mine alone. In the 1950s, a fund, Norrlandsfonden was established, in which profits from LKAB would be invested in order to diversify the local economy. The municipality started to lend money to startup companies at very beneficial rates, a scheme that lasted until 1959 because the banks, that insisted this was unfair competition, had established more relaxed rules for lending. The industrial area east of the city was built in the 1950s to separate industry from neighborhoods.

On 10 November 1960, Kiruna Airport opened to separate civilian air traffic from the military airplanes that had landed at Kalixfors airport and at Luossajärvi since World War I. A road to Nikkaluokta was opened in 1971 and to Riksgränsen and Narvik (a coastal Norwegian town) in 1984. The latter had been heavily debated, since alternative plans existed to build the road to Norway on the northern side of Torneträsk, via Laimo, Kattuvuoma, Salmi to Innset and Bardu in Norway. That road was never built, but a 25 km long track between Laimo and Salmi was built on the initiative of the locals and finished in 1962; however, this track, called Talmavägen, is not connected to any other road.

Increased communications were also beneficial for tourism. Swedish Railways had already run special trains before World War II, but started a special Dollar train in the summer months between Gothenburg and Kiruna, connecting to cruise ships from the United States. The canoe club, Kiruna Långfärdspaddlare, was founded in 1972 and rafting for tourists restarted after it had been discontinued for 20 years due to the drowning of Valfrid Johansson. Until the 1980s, tourism had mainly been a summer business, but dog sledging for tourists was started in 1983 in Jukkasjärvi. In 1990, the first Icehotel, rebuilt each year from blocks of ice, was built in Jukkasjärvi and advertised as the world's largest igloo. It had been built using techniques from the building of Malmbanan 90 years before and was also inspired by the Snow Festival, which dated from 1986 to celebrate the Swedish Viking satellite. Since 1998, a special tourist area has existed in the mine and since 1999, tourists can visit the various research projects taking place in Kiruna.

In 1957, the Kiruna Geophysical Observatory (KGO) (now the Swedish Institute of Space Physics) was founded and established by the Royal Swedish Academy of Sciences. The Esrange Space Centre was established in 1966 for rocket launches and ground-based observations, with balloon operations since 1974, satellites launched since 1978 and testing operations since 2000 (with the Swedish Defence Material Administration). ESA has operated a satellite station at Salmajärvi, near Esrange, since 1989. In 1987, Umeå University started a space engineering program in Kiruna, and GIS education was started by Luleå University of Technology in 1991. In 1993, The Umeå space engineers moved to the same building housing IRF and a year later another Luleå University programme, civil engineering with specialisation in space technology, started at the same location. Since 2006, the Erasmus Mundus Master Course in Space Science and Technology has started with at least one semester spent at LTU. In 2007, education along IRV was split and only the Department of Space Science, belonging to Luleå University of Technology, remained, while the Umeå University programme in Space Engineering ended.

As noted, the Kiruna Icehotel has been built in Jukkasjärvi each winter since 1990 and is a major tourist attraction.

=== The 21st century urban transformation ===
The re-development of Kiruna is a reconstruction project, as the Kirunavaara mine, run by LKAB, undermines the existing town centre. Several buildings are to be moved or demolished. The town center is to be moved 3 kilometers (1.9 mi) to the east.

In 2004, it was decided that the present centre of the municipality would have to be relocated to counter mining-related subsidence. The relocation was to be made gradually over the coming decade. On January 8, 2007, a new location was proposed, northwest to the foot of the Luossavaara mountain, by the lake of Luossajärvi.

The first actual work on moving the town was done in November 2007, when work on the new main sewage pipe started.

In the same week, the first sketches for the layout of the new part of the town became available. The sketches include a travel centre, the new locations for the city hall and the church, an artificial lake, and an extension of the Luossavaara hill into the city. The location of the new section of the E10 was still uncertain, as was the location of the railway and the railway station. A more official sketch was published early in spring 2008, which was then discussed with various interest groups before a further version was to be produced.

In June 2010, the municipal council decided that the town would be moved eastwards (to 67°51′1″N 20°18′2″E), in the direction of Tuolluvaara, instead of the proposed northwestern location. The moving of the town was started in 2014, and the plan describes a process that continues to 2100. In the years 2012-2013, an international architectural competition concerning the vision, strategy, and design of a new city centre for a new Kiruna was arranged by the Municipality of Kiruna in partnership with the Swedish Association of Architects. White Arkitekter AB, based in Gothenburg, together with Ghilardi + Hellsten Arkitekter, based in Oslo, Spacescape AB, Vectura Consulting AB, and Evidens BLW AB, won the competition with their masterplan and strategy for moving the city. The competition team was led by White Arkitekter AB, lead architect Mikael Stenqvist, SAR/MSA, in collaboration with Ghilardi + Hellsten Arkitekter, lead architect Ellen Hellsten. Together with researchers from Luleå and Delft universities, it envisages a denser city centre with a greater focus on sustainability, green and blue infrastructure, pedestrians, and public transport rather than automobiles. In 2018, the Swedish government announced that it would help arrange replacement work for radio corporation Radiotjänst after the city had been moved from its original location.

Starting in 2013, Danish explorer and photographer Klaus Thymann began a long-term project documenting the resettlement of the town. Using GPS-tagged imagery, he has returned multiple times since, replicating precise locations to show the changing landscape. In 2017 Thymann returned again to Kiruna to document the redevelopment of the town for Bloomberg Businessweek.

In August 2025, Kiruna Church was relocated towards the new centere as part of the LKAB town move. The 113-year-old building is protected by the Sweden Cultural Heritage Act and was transported in whole to prevent damage. Again, the process was documented by photographer Klaus Thymann.

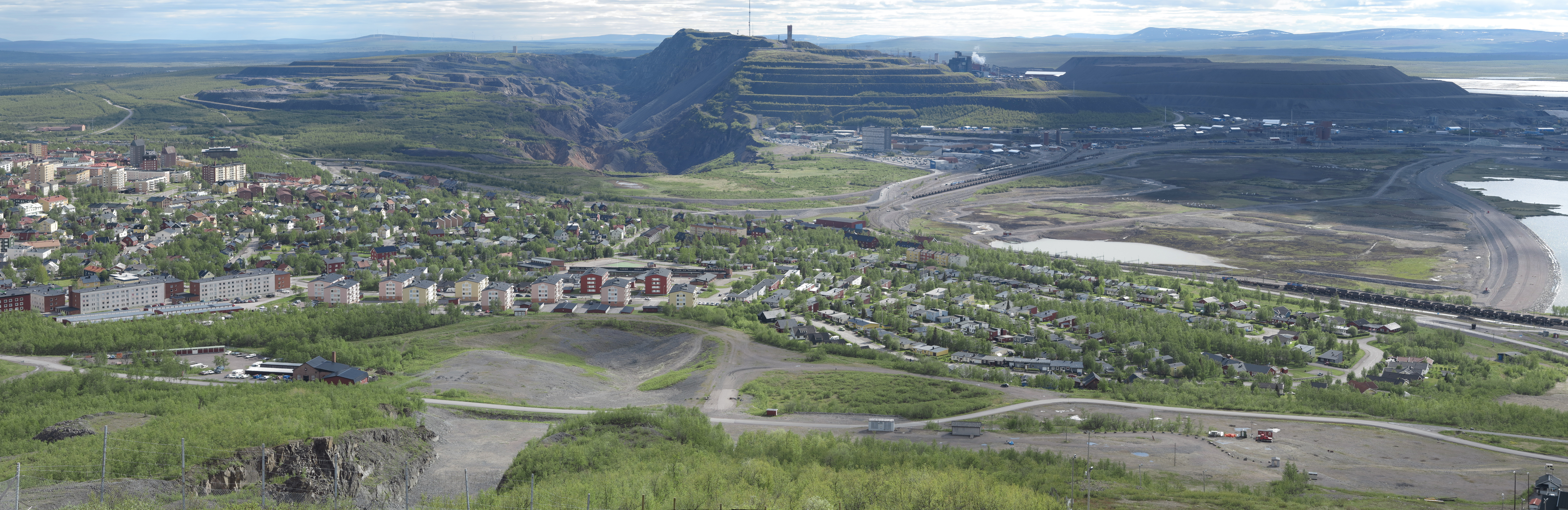
Kiruna city panorama, taken from Luossavaara, 2014

== Geography ==
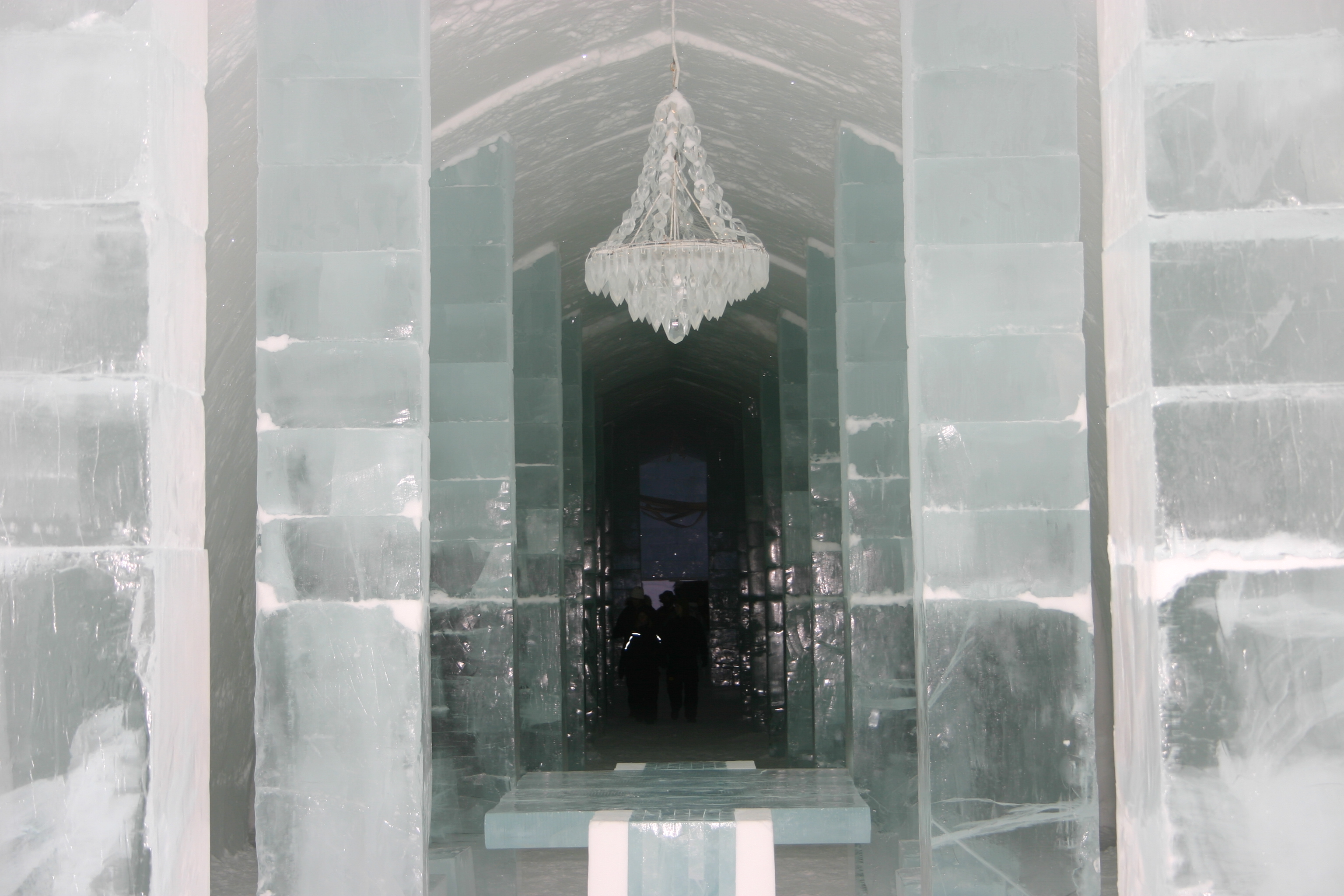
The ice hotel in Jukkasjärvi

Kiruna is located in the north of Sweden, 145 kilometres (90 mi) north of the Arctic Circle. The city centre is built on the Haukavaara hill at an altitude of 530 m, high above the Torne river to the north and the Kalix River to the south. Other parts of the town are Lombolo and Tuolluvaara, to which buildings are being moved to accommodate mine expansion. Near Kiruna are the mountains of Kiirunavaara and Luossavaara. Kiirunavaara iron ore mine is still the town's primary economic resource. Luossavaara has ceased miningis and now a ski slope.

The city is built near Luossajärvi lake with outflow to the Luossajoki that flows in the Torne River at Laxforsen. The area around Kiruna is very sparsely populated. The northwest, west and southwest of Kiruna are dominated by the Scandinavian Mountains, visible from the city centre. Sweden's highest mountain, Kebnekaise, is 75 kilometres (47 mi) from the city centre and can be seen as well. To the west is Nikkaluokta and to the northwest are Abisko, Björkliden, Riksgränsen and the Norwegian town of Narvik, now 180 kilometres (110 mi) via road. 12 kilometres (7 mi) north of Kiruna is Kurravaara, on the edge of the Torne River. The land north of Kurravaara is roadless, uninhabited, partly barren and partly birch forest, up to the Norwegian and Finnish borders at Treriksröset. The lower-lying east is dominated by boreal forest, stretching thousands of kilometres through Finland and Russia. Around 15 km east of Kiruna is a group of villages at the Torne River, most notably Jukkasjärvi, where the ice hotel is built each winter, attracting tourists from all over the world. The twin cities Gällivare and Malmberget are some 120 km south of Kiruna.

Kiruna became a Swedish city on 1 January and was at one time listed as the largest city in the world by area, even if most of its territory was non-urban. After the Swedish municipality reform in the 1970s, the term "city" has been legally discontinued. Today only the built-up area is considered a de facto city.

=== Climate ===
Being located 145 km (90 miles) north of the Arctic Circle, Kiruna has a subarctic climate (Dfc) with short, mild summers and long, cold winters, although the city itself can be considerably milder than the surrounding forest. Snow cover generally lasts from late September to mid-May, but snowfall can occur year-round. The midnight sun between 28 May and 16 July (50 days), and white nights lasts from early May to early August. Polar night lasts from 11 December to 1 January (22 days), the exact boundaries depending on local topography. Even though Kiruna's winters are very cold by Swedish standards, they are still much less severe than winters on similar latitudes in North America and Siberia, and even more southerly areas in other parts of the world due to some maritime influence. Similar winter temperatures go as far south as below the 45th parallel in the Russian Far East as well as the interior upper Midwest and northern New England in the United States. Kiruna however, has cooler summers than such areas, but still warm enough to stay above polar climate and below the northern tree line. Winter temperatures however are significantly colder than areas immediately affected by the Gulf Stream to a degree that the regular lows of Kiruna during January and February are similar to Tromsø's all-time record low.

The coldest confirmed temperature ever in Kiruna was recorded at the nearby weather station with −43.3 °C (−45.9 °F) recorded in January 1999. The weather station recorded 31.6 °C (88.9 °F) in July 1945, which is the all-time record. The warmest month on record at the weather station was July 2018, with average high temperatures of 24.3 °C (75.7 °F). Kiruna has a gloomy climate, affected by Atlantic low-pressure systems. Due to its extreme daylight cycle, the period between April and August account for 73% of Kiruna's annual sunshine according to the 1961-1990 normals, whereas the five darkest months between October and February contain only around 10% of the annual sunshine.

Climate data for Kiruna Airport (2002–2021 averages, extremes since 1901), precipitation from Rensjön
Month	Jan	Feb	Mar	Apr	May	Jun	Jul	Aug	Sep	Oct	Nov	Dec	Year
Record high °C (°F)	7.3 (45.1)	8.1 (46.6)	9.5 (49.1)	16.6 (61.9)	24.9 (76.8)	28.5 (83.3)	31.6 (88.9)	27.7 (81.9)	23.3 (73.9)	16.1 (61.0)	10.4 (50.7)	8.7 (47.7)	31.6 (88.9)
Mean maximum °C (°F)	2.7 (36.9)	3.9 (39.0)	5.0 (41.0)	10.1 (50.2)	19.1 (66.4)	23.5 (74.3)	24.6 (76.3)	23.1 (73.6)	17.8 (64.0)	10.2 (50.4)	4.9 (40.8)	4.0 (39.2)	26.2 (79.2)
Mean daily maximum °C (°F)	−7.9 (17.8)	−6.7 (19.9)	−2.4 (27.7)	3.1 (37.6)	8.9 (48.0)	14.8 (58.6)	18.5 (65.3)	15.9 (60.6)	10.2 (50.4)	2.5 (36.5)	−2.8 (27.0)	−5.1 (22.8)	4.1 (39.4)
Daily mean °C (°F)	−12.4 (9.7)	−11.2 (11.8)	−7.1 (19.2)	−1.3 (29.7)	4.7 (40.5)	10.3 (50.5)	13.8 (56.8)	11.5 (52.7)	6.5 (43.7)	−0.7 (30.7)	−6.5 (20.3)	−9.3 (15.3)	−0.1 (31.7)
Mean daily minimum °C (°F)	−16.8 (1.8)	−15.7 (3.7)	−11.8 (10.8)	−5.6 (21.9)	0.5 (32.9)	5.7 (42.3)	9.1 (48.4)	7.0 (44.6)	2.7 (36.9)	−3.8 (25.2)	−10.1 (13.8)	−13.4 (7.9)	−4.3 (24.2)
Mean minimum °C (°F)	−29.1 (−20.4)	−28.1 (−18.6)	−23.6 (−10.5)	−16.2 (2.8)	−6.7 (19.9)	0.2 (32.4)	3.1 (37.6)	0.3 (32.5)	−4.0 (24.8)	−14.2 (6.4)	−22.5 (−8.5)	−25.1 (−13.2)	−32.0 (−25.6)
Record low °C (°F)	−40.1 (−40.2)	−42.3 (−44.1)	−36.8 (−34.2)	−31.1 (−24.0)	−21.0 (−5.8)	−5.0 (23.0)	−1.8 (28.8)	−5.0 (23.0)	−11.8 (10.8)	−28.8 (−19.8)	−32.3 (−26.1)	−37.5 (−35.5)	−42.3 (−44.1)
Average precipitation mm (inches)	25.7 (1.01)	20.2 (0.80)	15.2 (0.60)	19.3 (0.76)	44.8 (1.76)	54.6 (2.15)	92.7 (3.65)	66.2 (2.61)	57.8 (2.28)	39.6 (1.56)	25.8 (1.02)	31.5 (1.24)	493.4 (19.44)
Mean monthly sunshine hours	8	69	162	208	238	244	244	180	118	75	21	0	1,567
Source 1: SMHI Open Data for Rensjön A, precipitation
Source 2: SMHI Open Data for Kiruna flygplats, temperature

Climate data for Kiruna (Esrange 2002–2018, extremes since 1901)
Month	Jan	Feb	Mar	Apr	May	Jun	Jul	Aug	Sep	Oct	Nov	Dec	Year
Record high °C (°F)	7.3 (45.1)	7.3 (45.1)	11.3 (52.3)	15.2 (59.4)	27.0 (80.6)	29.8 (85.6)	31.6 (88.9)	28.4 (83.1)	24.3 (75.7)	16.1 (61.0)	9.2 (48.6)	8.0 (46.4)	31.6 (88.9)
Mean maximum °C (°F)	1.4 (34.5)	3.5 (38.3)	5.9 (42.6)	11.3 (52.3)	21.0 (69.8)	24.3 (75.7)	25.3 (77.5)	24.5 (76.1)	18.3 (64.9)	10.5 (50.9)	4.8 (40.6)	3.5 (38.3)	27.3 (81.1)
Mean daily maximum °C (°F)	−9.1 (15.6)	−7.2 (19.0)	−1.8 (28.8)	4.0 (39.2)	10.3 (50.5)	15.5 (59.9)	19.7 (67.5)	16.8 (62.2)	10.9 (51.6)	2.9 (37.2)	−3.4 (25.9)	−6.1 (21.0)	4.4 (39.9)
Daily mean °C (°F)	−14.0 (6.8)	−12.2 (10.0)	−7.3 (18.9)	−0.9 (30.4)	5.4 (41.7)	10.6 (51.1)	14.5 (58.1)	11.8 (53.2)	6.6 (43.9)	−0.6 (30.9)	−7.5 (18.5)	−10.9 (12.4)	−0.4 (31.3)
Mean daily minimum °C (°F)	−18.8 (−1.8)	−17.2 (1.0)	−12.8 (9.0)	−5.7 (21.7)	0.5 (32.9)	5.7 (42.3)	9.2 (48.6)	6.8 (44.2)	2.3 (36.1)	−4.1 (24.6)	−11.6 (11.1)	−15.7 (3.7)	−5.1 (22.8)
Mean minimum °C (°F)	−32.9 (−27.2)	−31.4 (−24.5)	−27.3 (−17.1)	−17.1 (1.2)	−6.5 (20.3)	−0.6 (30.9)	2.9 (37.2)	−0.7 (30.7)	−4.7 (23.5)	−15.0 (5.0)	−24.9 (−12.8)	−29.5 (−21.1)	−35.7 (−32.3)
Record low °C (°F)	−43.3 (−45.9)	−42.3 (−44.1)	−36.8 (−34.2)	−31.1 (−24.0)	−21.0 (−5.8)	−5.8 (21.6)	−1.8 (28.8)	−4.0 (24.8)	−11.8 (10.8)	−28.8 (−19.8)	−34.6 (−30.3)	−38.0 (−36.4)	−43.3 (−45.9)
Average precipitation mm (inches)	37.7 (1.48)	29.8 (1.17)	19.4 (0.76)	20.9 (0.82)	45.7 (1.80)	70.9 (2.79)	100.6 (3.96)	72.2 (2.84)	64.8 (2.55)	42.0 (1.65)	41.4 (1.63)	42.3 (1.67)	587.7 (23.12)
Mean monthly sunshine hours	8.9	69.8	161.8	203.8	236.9	227.1	245.5	182.5	117.2	80.9	21.5	0.0	1,555.9
Average ultraviolet index	0	0	1	2	3	4	4	3	2	1	0	0	2
Source 1: Swedish Meteorological and Hydrological Institute
Source 2: Ultraviolet Index

=== Transportation ===
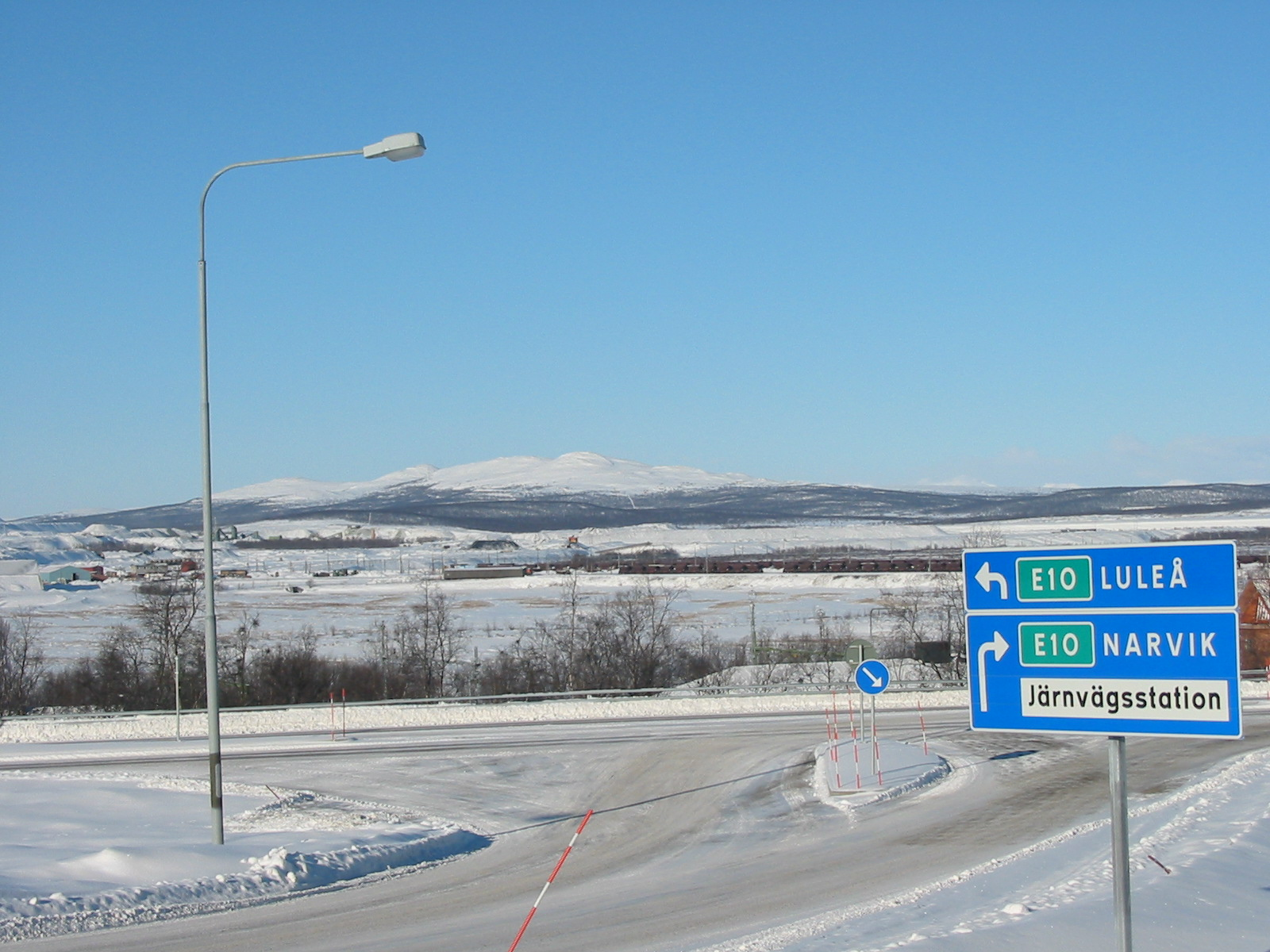
View from just outside Kiruna, with European route E10 left to Luleå and right to Narvik, Norway (and to Kiruna's railway station)

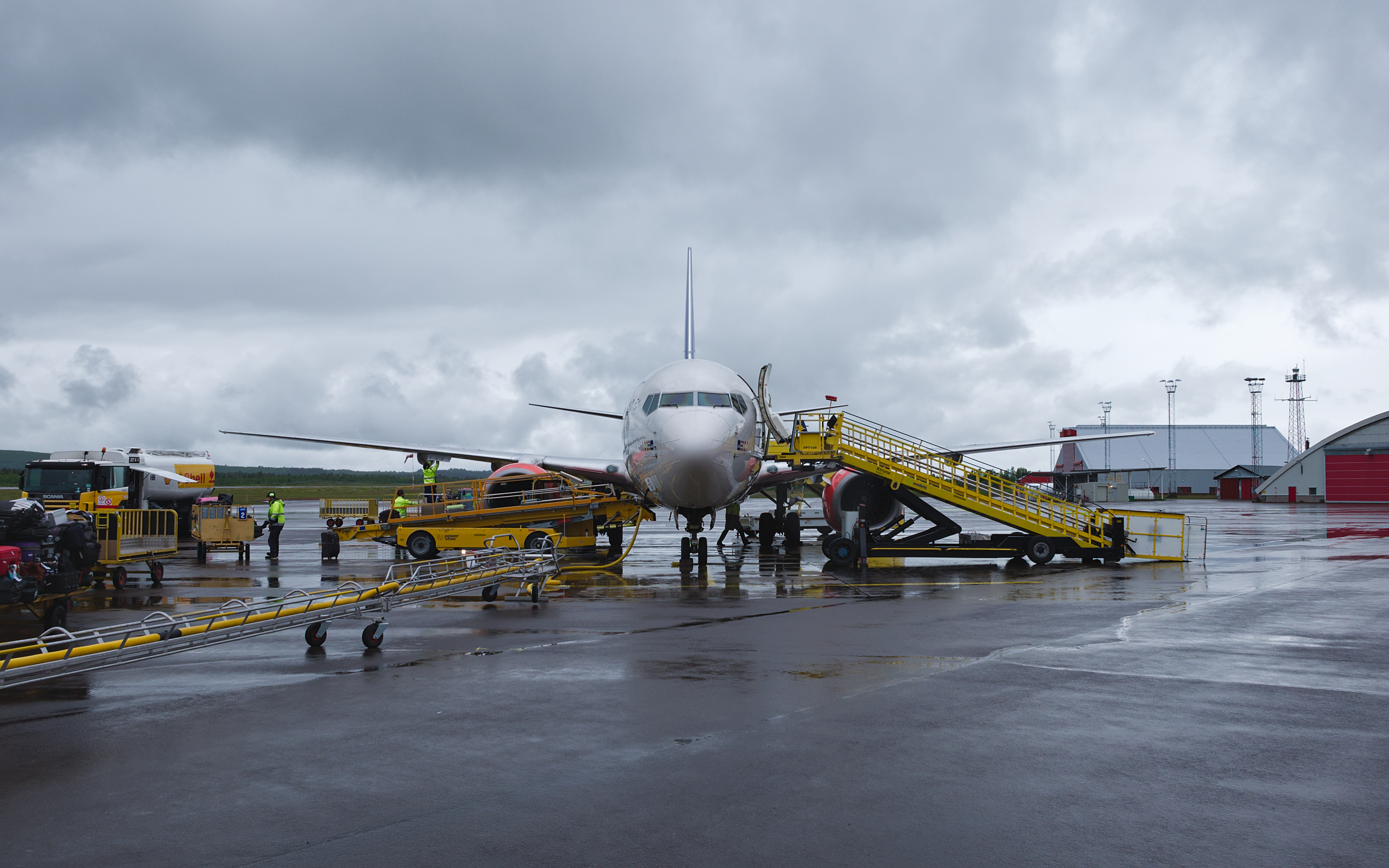
Boeing 737-600 aircraft at Kiruna Airport

Kiruna is on the E10 road, connecting Luleå with Norway and passing near Gällivare (south of Kiruna) and Narvik (on the Norwegian coast). A short road connects to Kurravaara at the Torne river and ends there. Another road connects Kiruna with Nikkaluokta close to Kebnekaise and is used by tourists to get to the mountains. It passes by or nearby several villages in the Kalix river valley.

Buses connect Kiruna with major towns in Norrbotten province and villages nearby and in the wider region. The railway connects Luleå with Gällivare, Kiruna and Narvik. Although built to serve the mine, Swedish Rail runs daily passenger traffic on the line: a night train from Narvik to Stockholm, a day train from Narvik to Luleå (connecting with a second night train to Stockholm and Gothenburg), and trains to Luleå and Narvik that start and finish in Kiruna. The latter is known as Karven and popular for day trips to the mountains near Abisko, Björkliden and Riksgränsen, particularly in winter. Additional long-distance trains are run by Transdev in summer. In 2013, the railway station was moved 2 km away from the city centre, so walking is possible but not recommended. There is a free shuttlebus for every departure and arrival which starts from Kiruna bus station in the city centre.

Kiruna Airport is southeast of the city, 8 km by road. A few daily flights connect Kiruna with Stockholm, either directly or via Luleå or Umeå.

== Economy ==
=== Mining ===
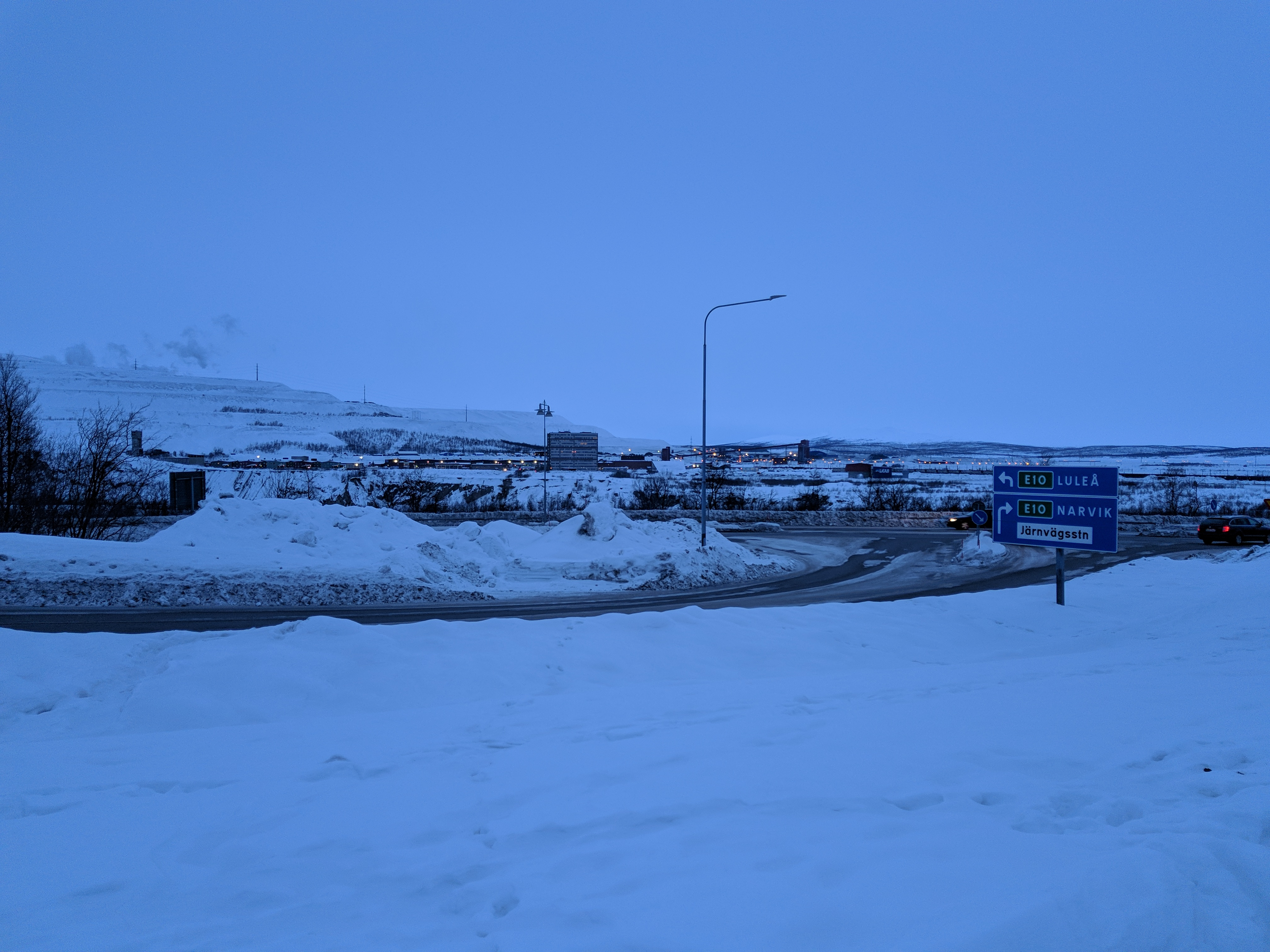
The ore body in Kiruna is an inclined slab of magnetite, 80 m wide, 4 km long and at least 2 km underground

Mining plays a major role as a source of national income and employment for Kiruna and the surrounding region. As with most of Northern Sweden the area is rich with magnetite which is mined to produce various iron ore products which are then transported by rail to Narvik port in Norway to be shipped to customers around the world. Large-scale mining in Kiruna started in the 19th century right around the time the major Swedish mining company LKAB was founded in 1890.

=== Space research ===
Space research started in the late 1940s.

The ESTRACK Kiruna Station of ESA, the European Space Agency, is located in the municipality. So is Esrange, the European Space and Sounding Rocket Range, as well as an EISCAT station and EISCAT scientific headquarters.

Also in Kiruna are the Institute of Space Physics and the Department of Space Science belonging to Luleå University of Technology.

In 2007, the Swedish government announced that Kiruna would be the host of Spaceport Sweden, signing an agreement with Virgin Galactic.

=== Tourism ===
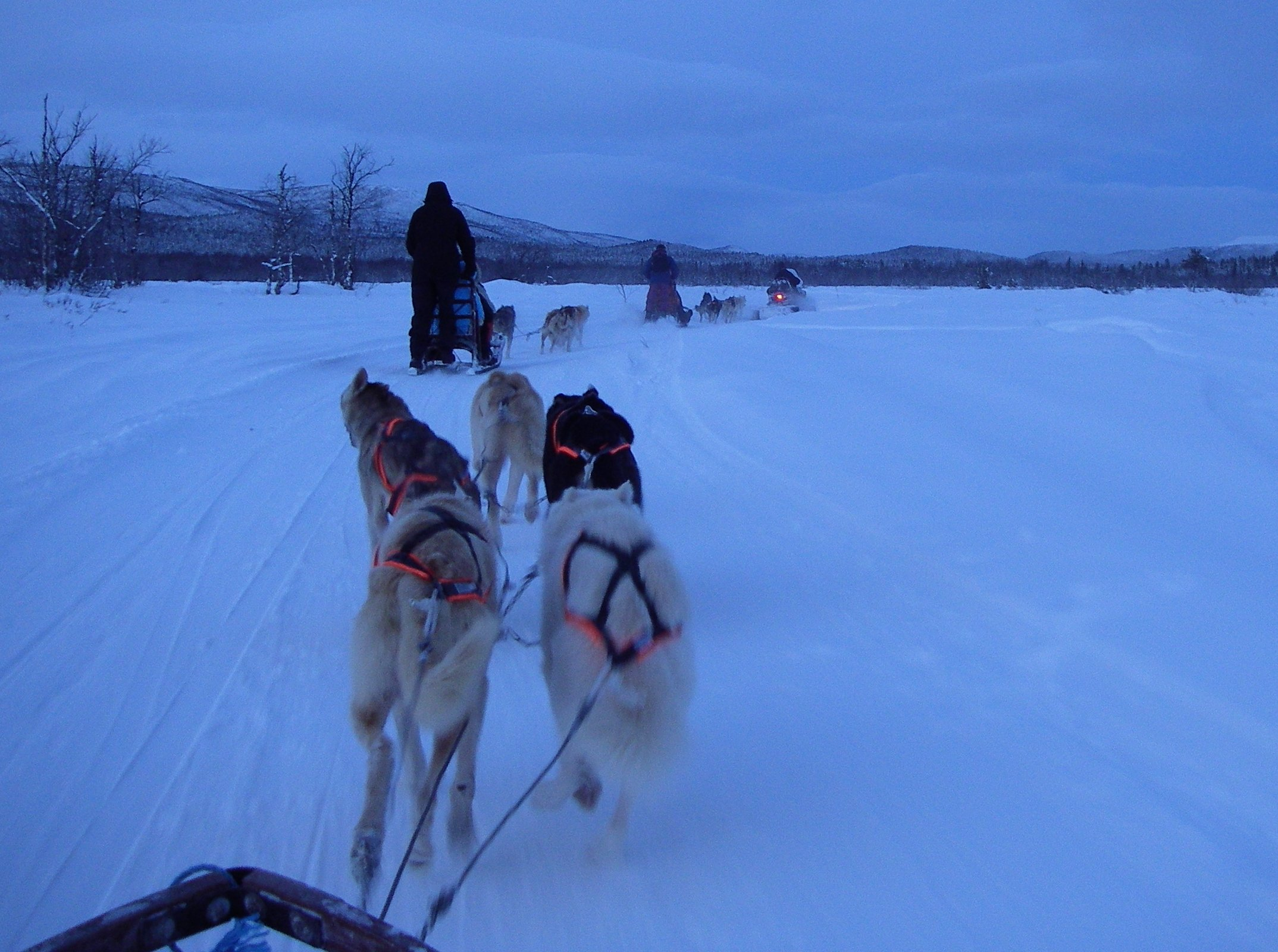
Dog sledding is a popular activity in the countryside surrounding Kiruna.

In winter, the Icehotel in nearby Jukkasjärvi and the northern lights attract tourists. The long and certain snow cover, which generally lasts from October to May, and frozen lakes and rivers facilitate cross-country and alpine skiing, dog sledding and snowmobiling. There is ice climbing in the mountains and ice skating on lakes or rivers. The annual Snow Festival is held over the last weekend of January and includes scooter jumping, reindeer racing and an ice sculpture contest.

== Sports ==
- Kiruna FF is a Swedish football club located in Kiruna. The club currently competes in Division 3 Norra Norrland, the fifth tier of the Swedish football league system.
- Kiruna IF is a Swedish ice hockey club located in Kiruna. The club currently competes in Hockeyettan, the third tier of the Swedish ice hockey league system.
- Kebnekaise BTK is a table-tennis club located in Kiruna. The club competes in Div 1 Norra, the third tier of the Swedish table-tennis league system. Kebnekaise BTK has consistently been one of Northern Sweden's most successful table-tennis clubs. Practice takes place in Sporthallen, the sports center located in central Kiruna.

== Notable residents ==
- Svarta Bjorn, legendary female cook during the founding of the town
- Emma Eliasson (born 1989), ice hockey defender in the Swedish Women's Hockey League, and member of the Sweden women's national ice hockey team
- Philip Kemi (born 1991), Swedish professional ice hockey player
- Fredrik Krekula (born 1974), Swedish professional ice hockey player
- Elvira Öberg (born 1999), Olympic champion biathlon
- Hanna Öberg (born 1995), Olympic champion biathlon
- Rednex, Eurodance and Swedish country band
- Börje Salming, National Hockey League (NHL) ice hockey defenceman; member of the Hockey Hall of Fame
- Per Spett, Olympic mogul skier

== Twin cities ==
- (Georgia (country)) Rustavi, Georgia
- Narvik, Norway
- Rovaniemi, Finland

== Former twin cities ==
- Arkhangelsk, Russia(1999–2022)

== See also ==
- Esrange
- Jänkänalusta
- Kauppinen
- Kiruna Church
- Kiruna dialect
- Kiruna Party
- Kiruna Stamell, an Australian-British actor named after this city
- Radiotjänst in Kiruna
- Spaceport Sweden
- Swedish Institute of Space Physics
