= Perite =

Mineral

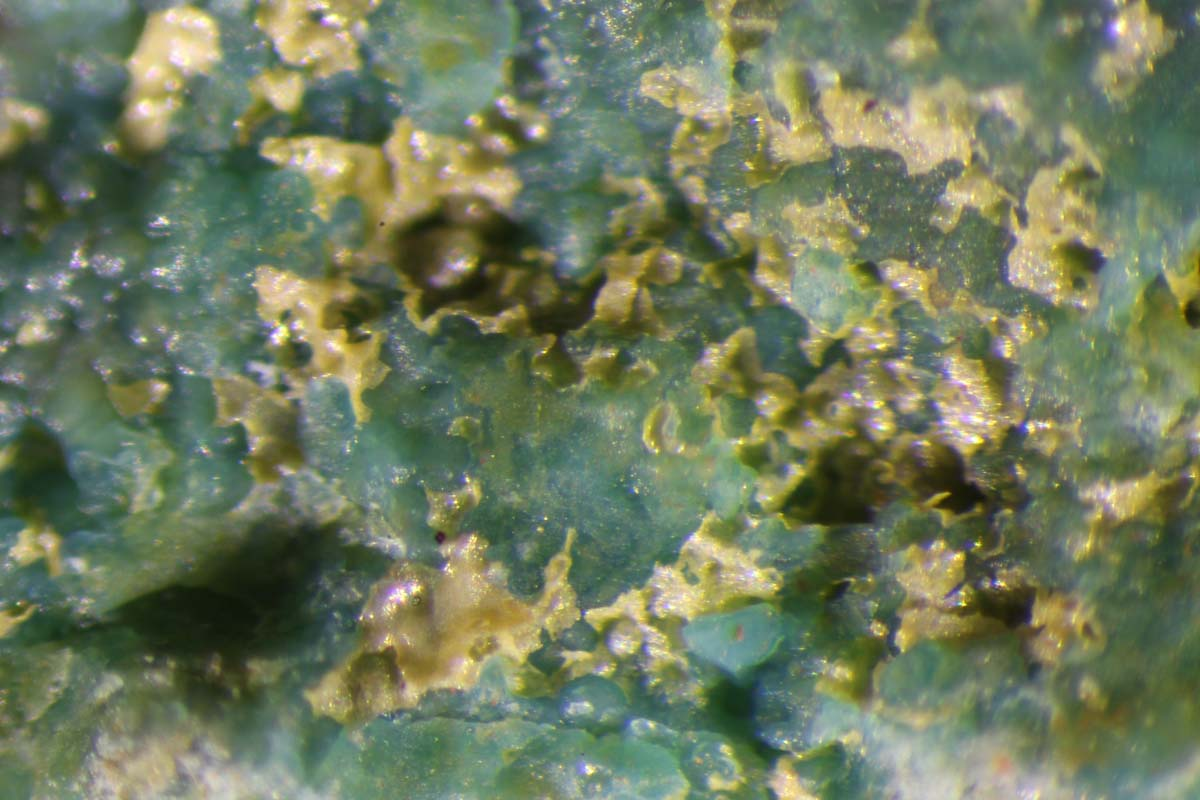
- Perite, from Blue Bell Claim, San Bernardino County, California, United States of America

General
- Category: Halide mineral
- Formula: PbBiO_{2}Cl
- IMA symbol: Pe
- Strunz classification: 3.DC.30
- Crystal system: Orthorhombic
- Crystal class: Dipyramidal (mmm); H-M symbol: (2/m 2/m 2/m)
- Space group: Bmmb
- Unit cell: a = 5.62 Å, b = 5.57 Å, c = 12.42 Å; Z = 4

Identification
- Formula mass: 483.63 g/mol
- Color: Yellow
- Crystal habit: Platey crystals, pseudotetragonal
- Cleavage: Fair on {001}
- Mohs scale hardness: 3
- Luster: Adamantine
- Streak: Yellow
- Diaphaneity: Translucent
- Specific gravity: 8.16
- Optical properties: Biaxial (+)
- Refractive index: n_{calculated} = 2.29 – 2.3
- Pleochroism: Trichroic

Perite is a mineral that has a general chemical formula of PbBiO_{2}Cl. The name is given for Per Adolf Geijer, a Swedish economic geologist with the Geological Survey of Sweden, who discovered the mineral in 1960 outside of Långban, Sweden. Perite is orthorhombic, space group Cmcm {C2/m 2/c 21/m}. In terms of its optical properties, Perite is anisotropic which means the velocity of light varies depending on direction through the mineral (i.e. it is birefringent). Its calculated relief is 1.45–1.461, which is moderate. It is colorless in plane polarized light, and it is weakly pleochroic. Perite is found in areas near igneous extrusions in places like the Western United States, Southern Australia, and scattered around Europe.

== Crystallography ==
Perite belongs to the orthorhombic crystal system, and has the properties of 2/m 2/m 2/m crystal class. Therefore, perite has three mirror planes and three twofold rotation axes.
