= Luossajärvi =

Lake in Kiruna, Sweden

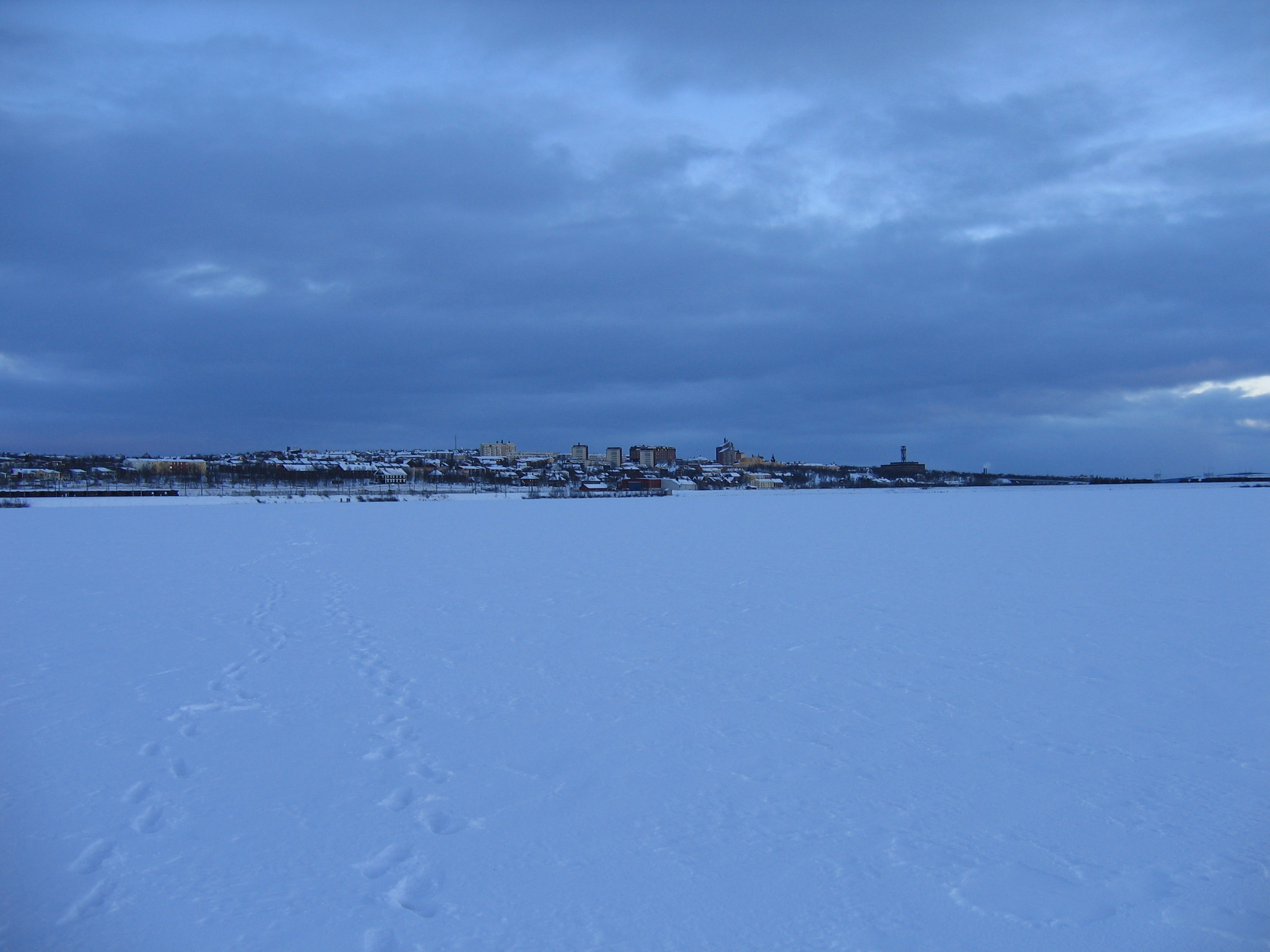
- Luossajärvi

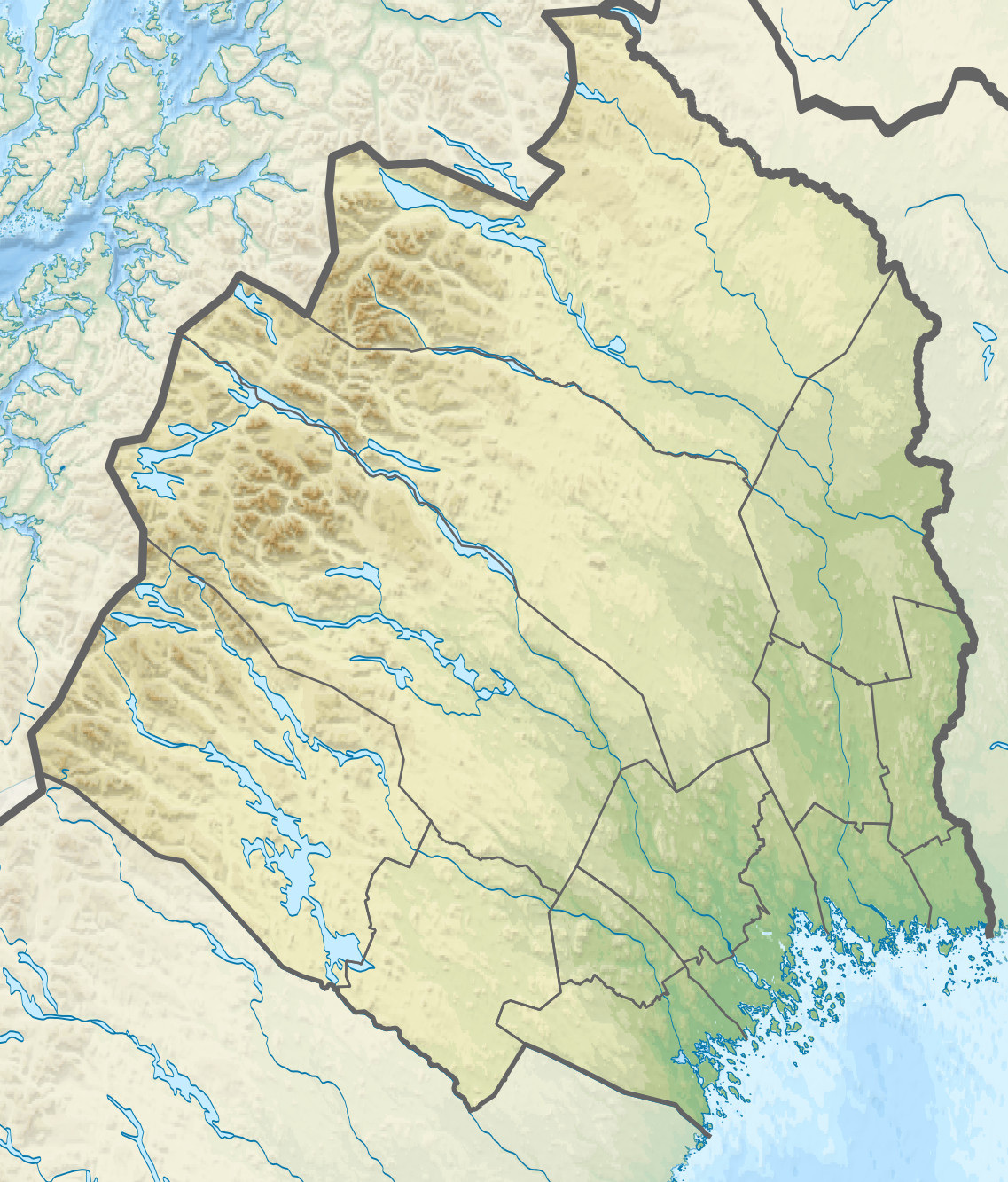
- Location within Norrbotten Location within Sweden
- Location: Kiruna
- Coordinates: 67°52′N 20°11′E
- Basin countries: Sweden
- Surface area: 2.4262 km^{2} (0.9368 mi^{2})
- Surface elevation: 499.1 m (1,637 ft)

Luossajärvi is a small 260-acre (1.1 km^{2}) lake in Kiruna in northern Sweden beside Luossavaara. The mining company LKAB has gradually emptied the southern part of the lake in 2007–8 to allow mining of iron ore in the peat bog. These drained areas today consist of mostly marshes.

== Environmental problems ==
The remaining portion of the lake has a chemical composition which shows the influence of mining activities. The lake has high concentrations of sulphate and nitrite. The high sulfate concentrations indicate extensive weathering processes of mainly carbonate and sulphurous materials.

== Fishing ==
Every winter ice fishing contests are held out on the ice. The name Luossajärvi derives from the rich number of trout that were in the lake. The original stocks consisted of perch, trout and pike, but these are now depleted to the point that now only perch naturally remain. The spawning ground for the natural brown trout populations has disappeared due to mining. However, other fish species have been introduced, including whitefish, grayling, char, rainbow trout and splake.
