= Hjalmar Lundbohm =

Swedish geologist and chemist

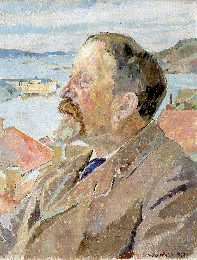
- Hjalmar Lundbohm painted by Carl Wilhelmson.
- Born: Johan Olof Hjalmar Lundbohm; 25 April 1855; Ödeborg, Sweden
- Died: 4 April 1926 (aged 70); Fritsla, Västra Götaland County Sweden
- Occupations: geologist and chemist

Signature
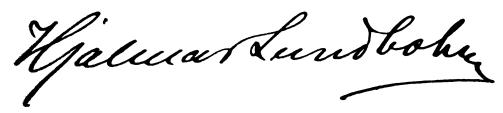

Johan Olof Hjalmar Lundbohm (25 April 1855 – 4 April 1926) was a Swedish geologist and chemist and the first managing director of LKAB (Luossavaara-Kiirunavaara Aktiebolag) in Kiruna. He made a strong contribution to the design of the new community of Kiruna in Lapland.

== Biography ==
Hjalmar Lundbohm was born in Ödeborg parish in Dalsland, Sweden. Lundbohm graduated in 1877 in technical chemistry and road and water construction at Chalmers University of Technology in Gothenburg. Lundbohm was employed at the Swedish Geological Survey in 1879. Became an assistant geologist in 1885 and appointed a regular geologist in the years 1887-1902. In 1898 Lundbohm got a job as site manager at Luossavaara-Kiirunavaara Aktiebolag (LKAB) based in Kiruna. In 1900, he was appointed manager of LKAB's mining operations in Luossajärvi. Lundbohm was later also given the operational responsibility for the mining facilities in Malmberget, Grängesberg and Stråssa as well as the port facilities in Luleå and Narvik. He also had discovered the iron ore deposits in Tuolluvaara near Kiruna. In 1902, the Kiruna Narvik Railway was completed, allowing the shipment of ore through the ice-free port of Narvik.

== Personal life ==
Hjalmar Lundbohmsgården was built in 1895 and used as a residence by Hjalmar Lundbohm. It is now open to the public and utilized as a conference center. In 1914, Lundbohm was appointed commander 2nd class in the Order of St. Olav. In 1920, when Hjalmar Lundbohm retired from his job as a manager in Kiruna. On April 2, 1926, Lundbohm suffered a stroke and became unconscious. He but died two days later and was buried in Kiruna.

== See also ==
- Kiruna Mine

== Gallery ==
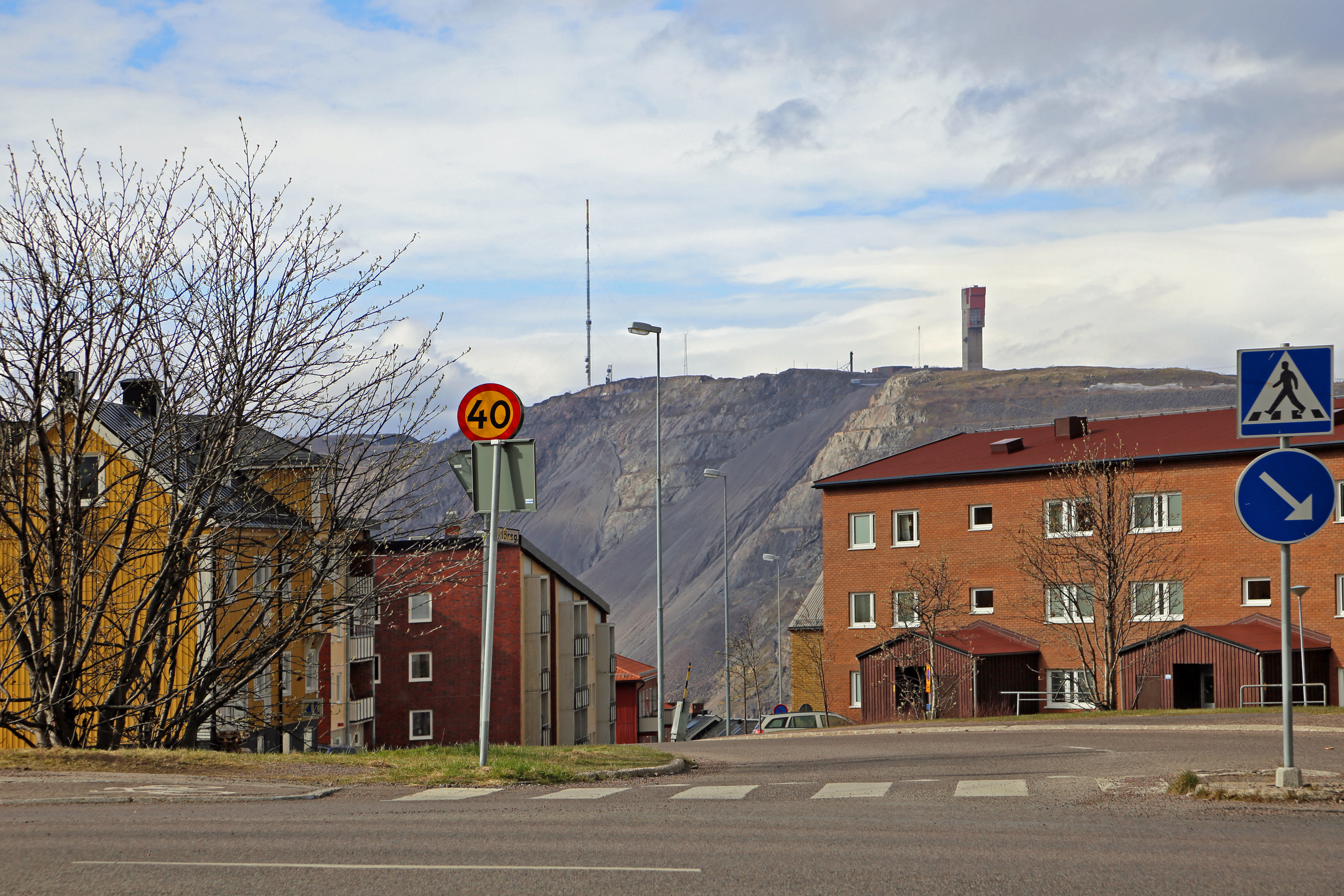
Kiruna and the Kiruna iron mine

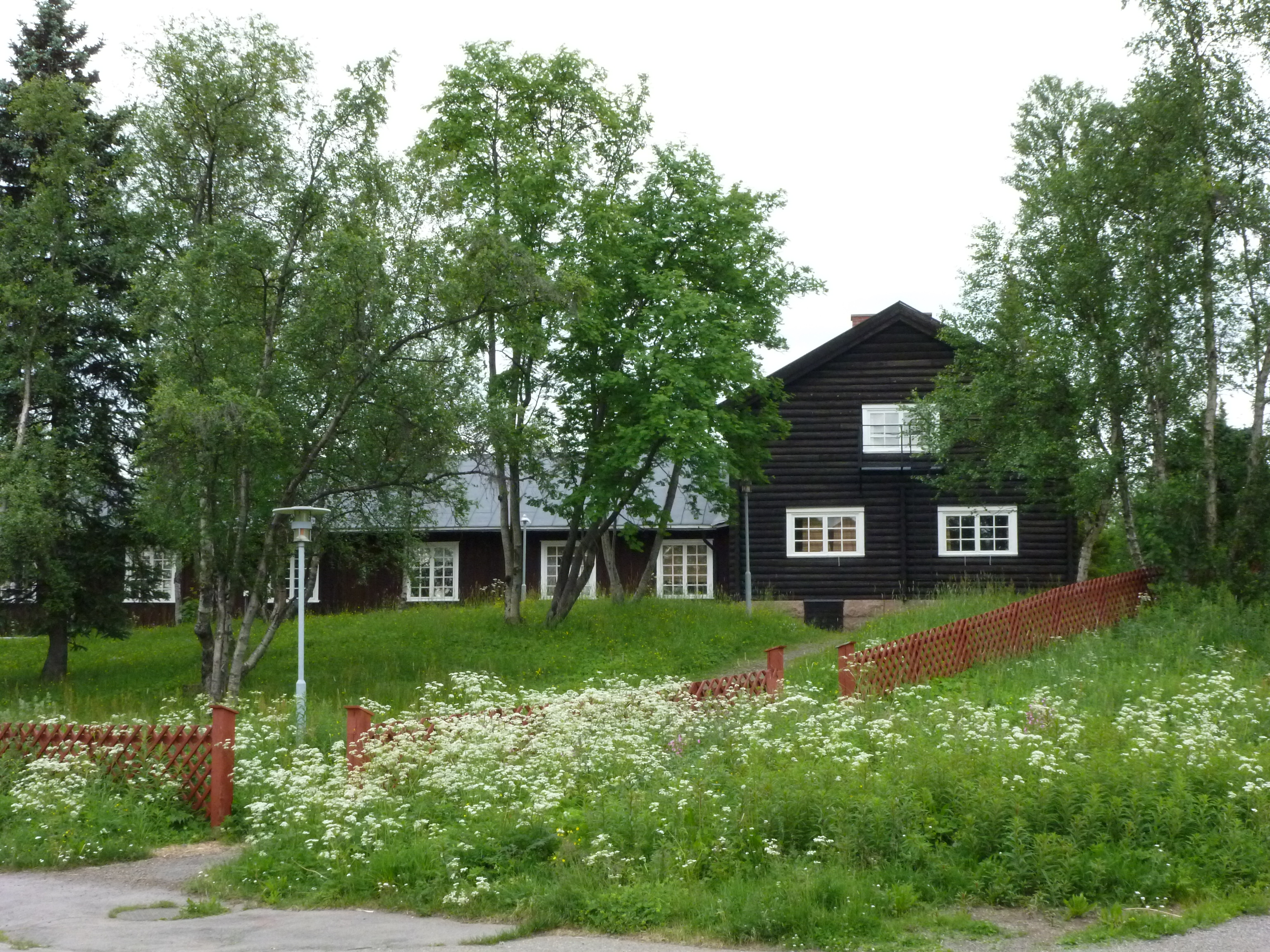
Hjalmar Lundbohmsgården at Kiruna

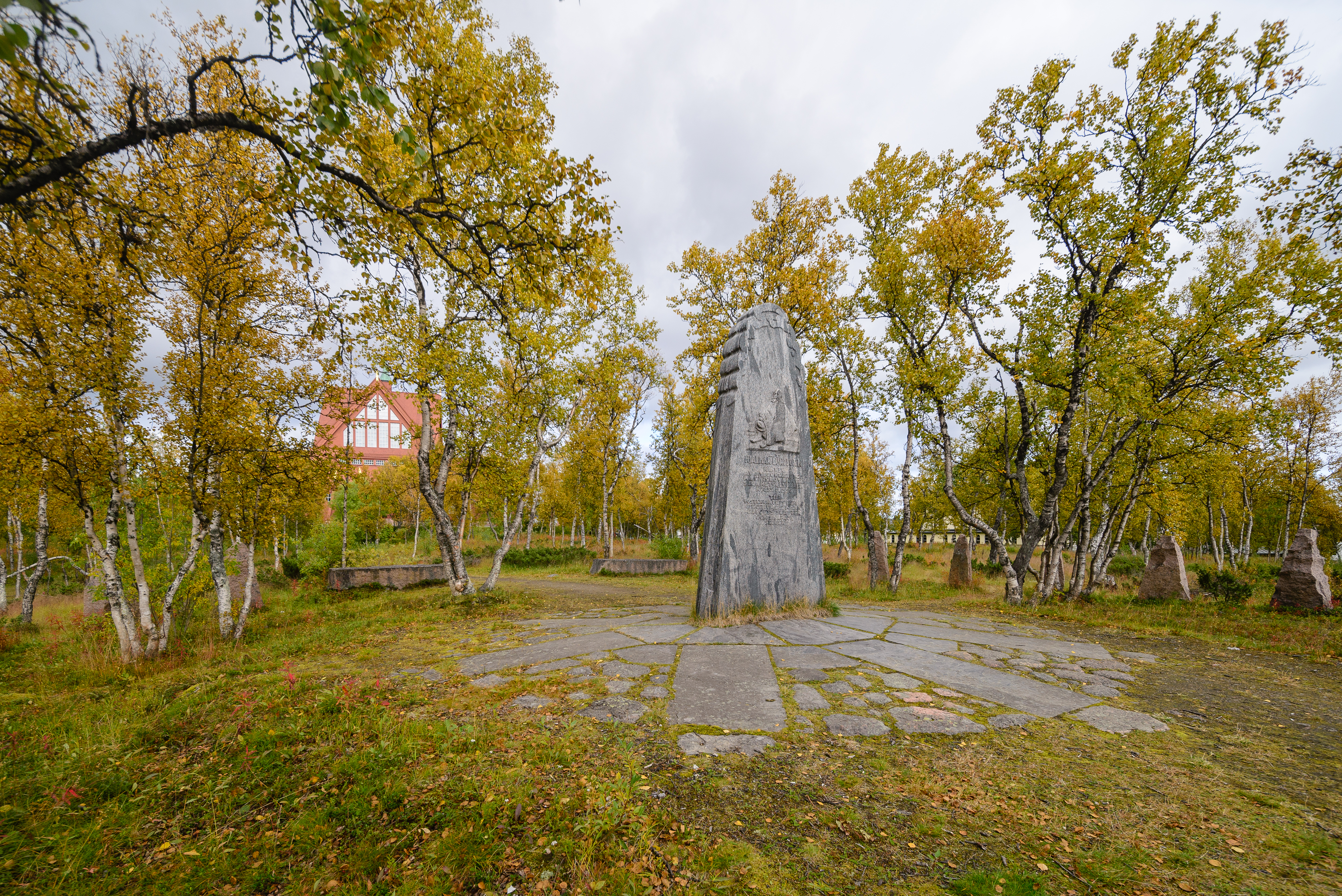
Hjalmar Lundbohm memorial at Kiruna
