= Dollaseite-(Ce) =

Epidote supergroup, sorosilicate mineral

General
- Category: Silicate mineral
- Formula: CaCeMg_{2}AlSi_{3}O_{11}F(OH)
- IMA symbol: Dls-Ce
- Crystal system: Monoclinic
- Crystal class: Prismatic (2/m) (same H-M symbol)
- Space group: P2_{1}/m

Identification
- Formula mass: 551.04 g/mol
- Color: Brown
- Crystal habit: Massive, somewhat prismatic, equant when subhedral
- Twinning: On [100]
- Cleavage: Indistinct, epidote has one good cleavage on one side
- Fracture: Flat regular to uneven
- Mohs scale hardness: 6.5–7
- Luster: Vitreous
- Streak: light brown
- Diaphaneity: Translucent
- Specific gravity: 3.9
- Optical properties: Biaxial (+)
- Refractive index: nα = 1.715 nβ = 1.718 nγ = 1.733
- Birefringence: δ = 0.018
- Pleochroism: Strong

Dollaseite-(Ce) is a sorosilicate end-member epidote rare-earth mineral which was discovered by Per Geijer (1927) in the Ostanmossa mine (Östanmossa gruva), Norberg district, Sweden. Dollaseite-(Ce), although not very well known, is part of a broad epidote group of minerals which are primarily silicates, the most abundant type of minerals on earth. Dollaseite-(Ce) forms as dark-brown subhedral crystals primarily in Swedish mines. With the ideal chemical formula, CaREE^{3+}Mg_{2}AlSi_{3}O_{11},(OH)F, dollaseite-(Ce) can be partially identified by its content of the rare earth element cerium.

== History ==
The mineral provisionally named "magnesium orthite" by Geijer himself was renamed after structural refinement by Peacor and Dunn in 1988 led to its proper classification. The name dollaseite-(Ce) was chosen in honor of Wayne Dollase, who performed broad research on epidote minerals. The original confusion of the mineral's composition was because of a complex atomic composition where an exchange of cations leads to a form of dollaseite-(Ce) that at first glimpse resembles an Mg analogue of allanite, now known as dissakisite-(Ce). Enami and Zang, Meyer, Hanson and Pearce also reported minerals that resembled the composition of a Mg analogue of allanite but none had sufficient data, or exact composition to be declared as a Mg analogue of allanite. It was not until 1991 that Edward S. Grew established dissakisite as the actual Mg-dominant allanite mineral with formula Ca(Ce,La)MgAl_{2}Si_{3}O_{12}(OH).

== Composition ==
With a general formula for the epidote group of A_{2}M_{3}Si_{3}O_{13}H dollaseite-(Ce) received its formula of CaREE^{3+}Mg_{2}AlSi_{3}O_{11},(OH)F based on data from electron microprobe analytical procedures. The results give the empirical formula (Ca_{.91} Ce_{.45} La_{.20} Nd_{.20} Pr_{.09} Sm_{.08} Gd_{.06})(Mg_{1.81} Fe_{.25})Al_{.97} Si_{3.0}(OH)_{1.25} F_{.88} O_{10.99} from which the standard formula is then derived after applying Levinson’s rules for renaming REE minerals.

== Structure ==
The atomic structure of dollaseite-(Ce) can be somewhat complex at times due to the charge-coupled substitution involving both cations and anions: (Fe,Al)^{3+} + O^{2−} = Mg^{2+} + F^{−}. The average epidote-group mineral’s structure has chains of edge-sharing octahedral such as Al^{3+}, Fe^{3+}, Mn^{3+}. The cavities that are formed by the octahedral chains that are occupied by A(1) and A(2) cations are occupied by Ca^{2+} and its REE, Ce^{3+}. Like the rest of the members of the epidote group, the aluminium octahedra in dollaseite-(Ce) share edges, forming endless chains. Similar to the other epidote-group minerals, dollaseite-(Ce) is monoclinic and thus is part of the space group P2_{1}/m. Peacor and Dunn (1988) refined the lattice parameters of dollaseite-(Ce) and concluded that the parameters were a=8.934(18) Å, b=5.721(7) Å, c=10.176(22) Å.

== Geologic occurrence ==
Dollaseite-(Ce) can generally be found in mineralized dolomite-tremolite rocks in the form of dark brown and subhedral crystals. Dollaseite-(Ce) can occur in a number of locations, but the most prominent is at Östanmossa, Sweden. The type of dollaseite-(Ce) that can generally be found at this location tends to be iron-poor and occurs in tremolite skarn. The fact that dollaseite-(Ce) can be prominently found in Sweden comes as no surprise since Sweden has been known to host many REE epidote-group minerals such as dissakisite-(Ce) and allanite-(Ce). Another dollaseite-(Ce) specimen with composition slightly similar to that of dissakisite-(Ce) can be found in rock composed of fluorite and fluorian phlogopite.

== See also ==
- List of minerals
- List of minerals named after people
