= Spaceport Sweden =

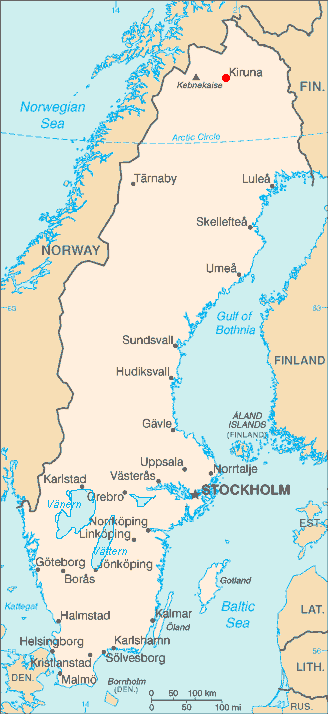
Kiruna in Sweden

Spaceport Sweden is a company that plans to make Kiruna the primary European Spaceport for personal suborbital spaceflight for space tourism, research, education, and a hub for cross-industry innovation. Spaceport Sweden is built by the Swedish Space Corporation.

Located in Kiruna, in Swedish Lapland, Spaceport Sweden is being developed at Kiruna Airport which will be a hybrid for air and space travel as well as for learning adventures, education and research.

Swedish Minister for Enterprise and Communication Maud Olofsson inaugurated the project as a national initiative in 2007. The current CEO of the spaceport is Karin Nilsdotter.

== History ==
The official inauguration of the company was made on 26 January 2007 and the company started off by signing an agreement with Virgin Galactic. The agreement stated that the two would be working together towards an operational agreement whereby Spaceport Sweden would be the first spaceport outside the United States which Virgin Galactic could use for flight campaigns.

On 3 April 2008, a press conference was held in Kiruna, and a number of astronauts in training were presented to the press, but details of an agreement, if any, were not released.

In February 2012, Spaceport Sweden hoped to have operational flights of SpaceShipTwo by 2015.

In 2012, Spaceport Sweden introduced an initiative aimed at offering educational adventures and spaceflight training, providing participants with the chance to delve deeper into the aurora borealis through northern lights flights in Kiruna. Additionally, in partnership with QinetiQ, they launched a two-day spaceflight preparation program that utilizes a long-arm centrifuge and hypobaric chamber to simulate conditions and prepare individuals for upcoming space missions.

In 2013, Spaceport Sweden initiated a limited offering of weightless flight experiences, in collaboration with AirZeroG and Novespace in France, to private individuals using a specially outfitted Airbus A300 capable of simulating a short-duration zero-gravity environment.

In 2015 Spaceport Sweden won a Kiruna Lapland Award for the efforts to establish commercial spaceflight in Kiruna, in Swedish Lapland.

== See also ==
- List of Spaceports
- Virgin Galactic
- Space tourism
- Suborbital spaceflight
