= Fredrik Krekula =

Swedish ice hockey player

- Born: April 8, 1974 (age 50); Kiruna, SWE
- Height: 6 ft 2 in (188 cm)
- Weight: 187 lb (85 kg; 13 st 5 lb)
- Position: Left wing
- Shot: Left
- SEL team Former teams: Skellefteå AIK; AIK
- Playing career: 1997–2009

Fredrik Krekula (born April 8, 1974) is a Swedish professional ice hockey player currently with the Skellefteå AIK of Elitserien.

== Career statistics ==
			Regular season					Playoffs
Season	Team	League	GP	G	A	Pts	PIM	GP	G	A	Pts	PIM
1991–92	Team Kiruna IF U20	Juniorserien	—	—	—	—	—	—	—	—	—	—
1991–92	Team Kiruna IF	Division 1	14	2	4	6	2	—	—	—	—	—
1992–93	Team Kiruna IF U20	Juniorallsvenskan	12	2	6	8	6	—	—	—	—	—
1992–93	Team Kiruna IF	Division 1	9	3	3	6	2	—	—	—	—	—
1993–94	Team Kiruna IF U20	Juniorallsvenskan	3	2	2	4	2	—	—	—	—	—
1993–94	Team Kiruna IF	Division 1	35	7	5	12	34	—	—	—	—	—
1994–95	Team Kiruna IF	Division 1	29	3	5	8	24	3	0	0	0	0
1995–96	Team Kiruna IF	Division 1	36	9	12	21	32	2	0	0	0	4
1996–97	Team Kiruna IF	Division 1	32	9	13	22	32	5	2	2	4	8
1997–98	AIK IF	Elitserien	41	6	9	15	32	—	—	—	—	—
1998–99	AIK IF	Elitserien	49	8	9	17	46	—	—	—	—	—
1999–00	AIK IF	Elitserien	46	4	5	9	32	—	—	—	—	—
2000–01	AIK IF	Elitserien	49	3	4	7	58	5	1	0	1	0
2001–02	Skellefteå AIK	Allsvenskan	42	16	3	19	34	6	1	0	1	4
2002–03	Skellefteå AIK	Allsvenskan	41	9	9	18	63	8	2	0	2	33
2003–04	Skellefteå AIK	Allsvenskan	42	11	8	19	30	10	3	3	6	8
2004–05	Skellefteå AIK	Allsvenskan	46	16	12	28	28	10	2	1	3	8
2005–06	Skellefteå AIK	HockeyAllsvenskan	38	7	4	11	32	10	4	2	6	12
2006–07	Skellefteå AIK	Elitserien	55	8	10	18	52	—	—	—	—	—
2007–08	Skellefteå AIK	Elitserien	48	4	12	16	44	4	0	0	0	2
2008–09	Skellefteå AIK	J20 Superelit	1	0	0	0	0	—	—	—	—	—
2008–09	Skellefteå AIK J20	Elitserien	36	1	2	3	28	11	1	0	1	14
Elitserien totals			324	34	51	85	292	20	2	0	2	16
Allsvenskan totals			171	52	32	84	155	28	7	4	11	49
Division 1 totals			155	33	42	75	126	10	2	2	4	12
