= Kiirunavaara =

Mountain in Norrbotten, Sweden

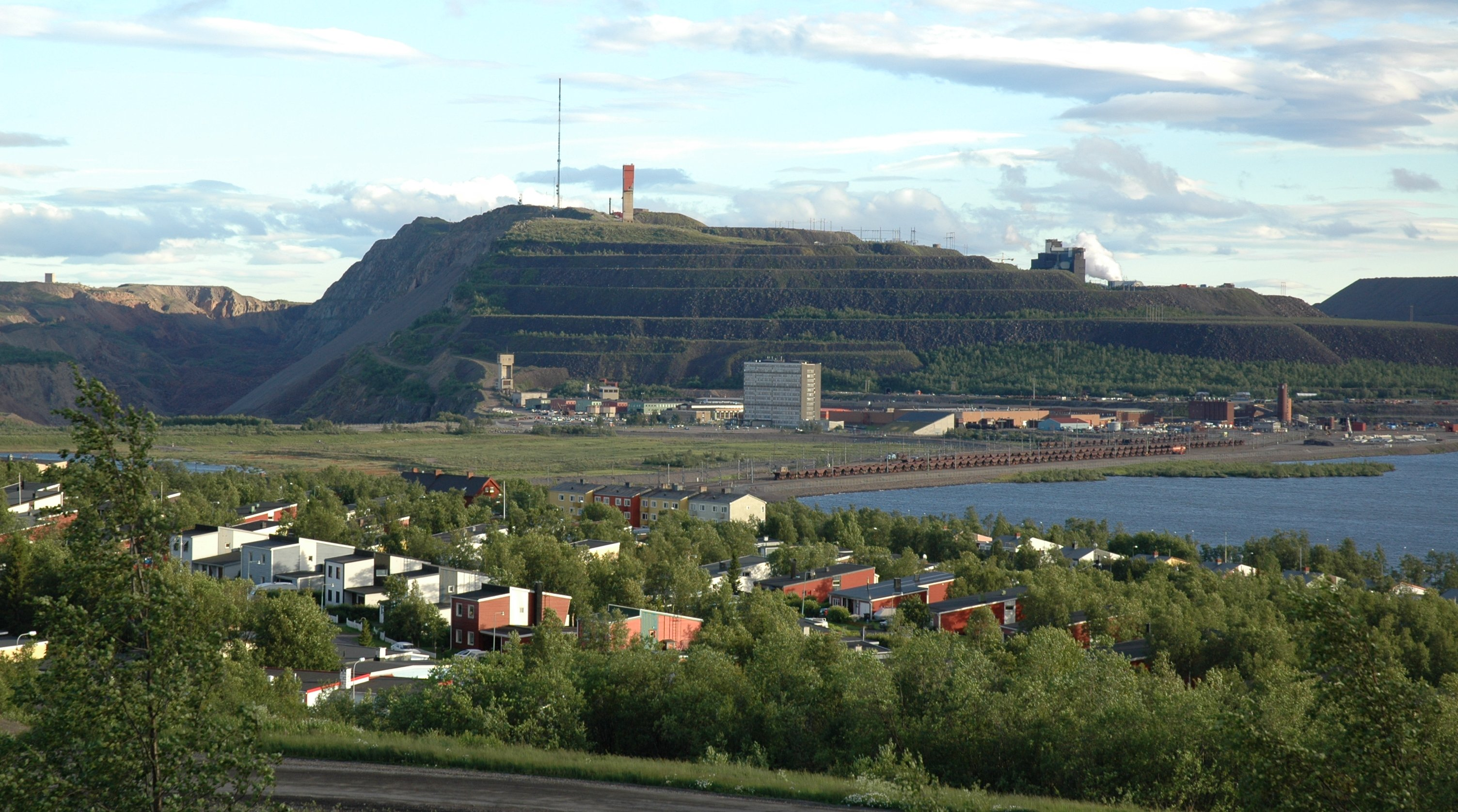

Highest point
- Elevation: 733 m (2,405 ft)
- Coordinates: 67°49′37″N 20°11′05″E

Geography
- Location: Kiruna, Sweden

Kiirunavaara (Northern Sami: Gironvárri, Meänkieli: Kierunavaara) is a mountain situated in Kiruna Municipality in Norrbotten County, Sweden. It contains one of the largest and richest bodies of iron ore in the world.

== History ==
The presence of iron in the area was known by the mid-17th century, but at this time communication lines to this northerly region were quite insufficient to permit any major exploitation. Only with the construction of the Iron Ore Line railway at the end of the 19th century, which connected the ports of Narvik on the Norwegian Sea and Luleå on the Baltic Sea, did commercial mining become a realistic proposition. The Swedish mining company LKAB (Luossavaara-Kiirunavaara Aktiebolag) has been mining the mountain since the beginning of the 20th century.

The mining area around Kiruna and Malmberget, together with the iron port and steelworks at Luleå, made Norrbotten County one of the first, and most prominent, regions of heavy industry in Sweden. The wider region has remained at the forefront of mining and steel smelting and alloying technology.

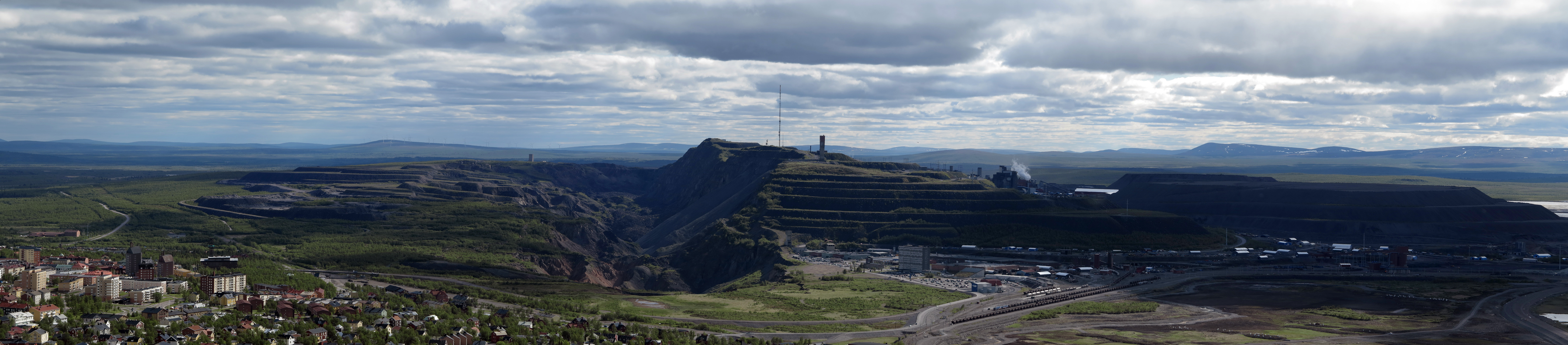

== See also ==
- Luossavaara
- Kiruna Mine
