= Luossavaara =

Mountain in Kiruna, Sweden

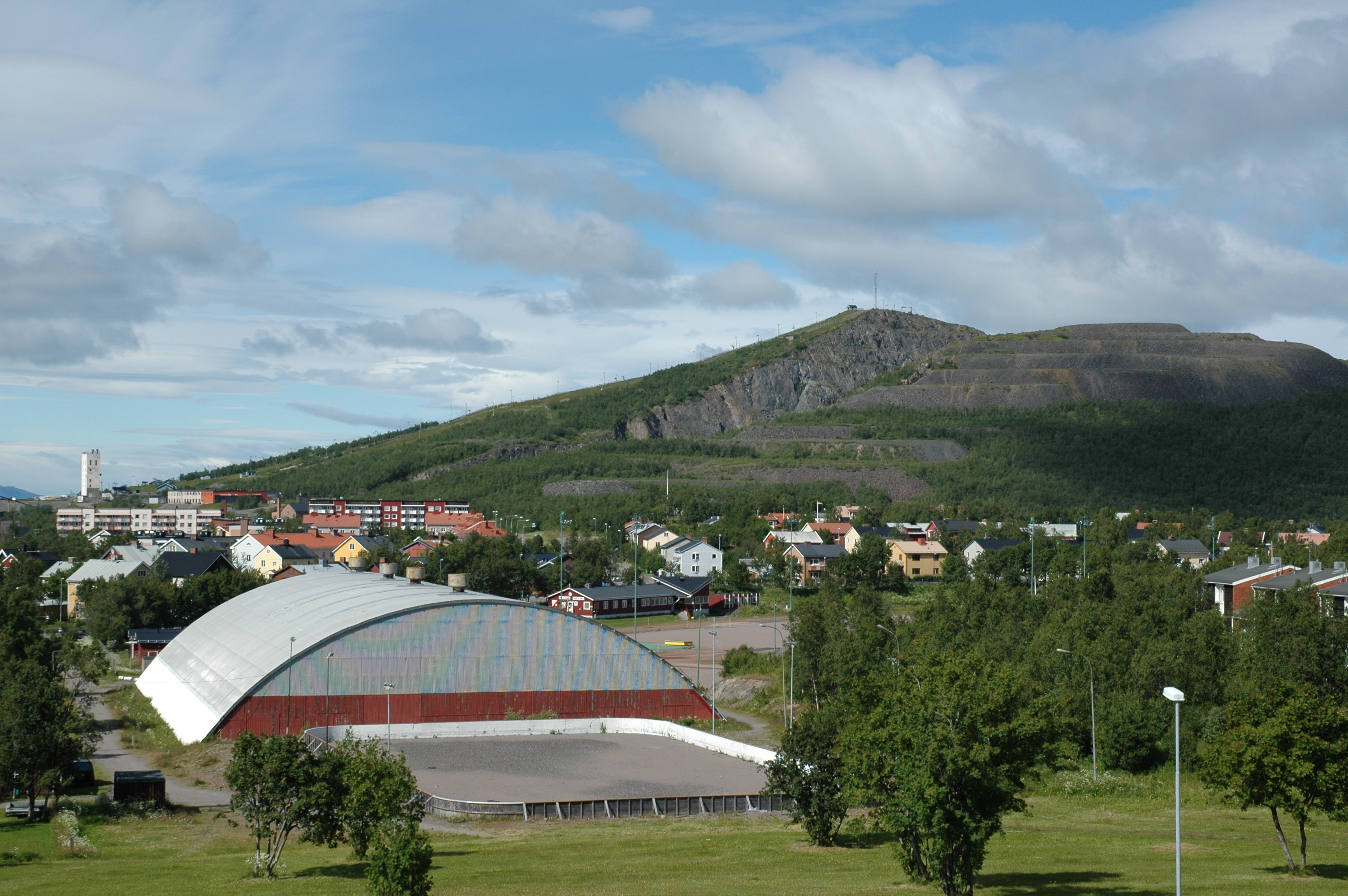

Highest point
- Elevation: 724 m (2,375 ft)
- Coordinates: 67°52′30″N 20°13′20″E

Geography
- Location: Kiruna, Sweden

Luossavaara (Northern Sami: Luossavárri) is a mountain in Kiruna, Sweden. It is the site of a now-inactive iron ore mine formerly operated by the Swedish mining company LKAB. Today it has a ski lift and slope, as well as a hiking path called Midnattsolstigen (the Midnight Sun Trail).

== See also ==
- Kiirunavaara
