= Superficial deposits =

Geological deposits

Superficial deposits (or surficial deposits) refer to geological deposits typically of Quaternary age (less than 2.6 million years old) for the Earth. These geologically recent unconsolidated sediments may include stream channel and floodplain deposits, beach sands, talus gravels and glacial drift and moraine. All pre-Quaternary deposits are referred to as bedrock.

== Types and history ==
There are several types of superficial deposit, including raised beaches and brickearth. These were formed in periods of climate change during the ice ages. The raised beaches were generally formed during periods of higher sea level, when ice sheets were at a minimum, and the sand and shingle deposits can be seen in many low cliffs. The brickearth is originally a wind-blown dust deposited under extremely cold, dry conditions but much has been re-deposited by flood water and mixed with flints.

Superficial deposits were originally recorded only onshore and around the coast where they were laid down by various natural processes such as action by ice, water and wind. More recently offshore deposits have been mapped and may be separate sea-bed sediments.

Most of these superficial deposits are unconsolidated sediments such as gravel, sand, silt and clay, and onshore they form relatively thin, often discontinuous patches. Almost all of these deposits were formerly classified on the basis of mode of origin with names such as, 'glacial deposits', 'river terrace deposits' or 'blown sand'; or on their composition such as 'peat'.

Geology databases contain information on the properties of superficial deposits. Geological survey houses these Geology databases. This information can be used for a number of different purposes in farming and forestry, including avoiding erosion, assessing growing conditions, gauging risks in terms of nutrient leaching and release of toxic substances, planning site preparation, road construction, felling and extraction operations, judging accessibility etc.

== Geological Survey ==
Each country and is some countries each state or province has an organization with a superficial deposits database. Some of the geological survey are:

- United States Geological Survey
  - California Geological Survey
  - Arkansas Geological Survey
  - Arizona Geological Survey
  - Delaware Geological Survey
  - Oklahoma Geological Survey
  - Iowa Geological Survey
  - Indiana Geological and Water Survey
  - Kansas Geological Survey
  - Louisiana Geological Survey
  - Utah Geological Survey
  - Michigan Geological Survey
  - Minnesota Geological Survey
  - Pennsylvania Geological Survey
  - Kentucky Geological Survey
- British Geological Survey
- Geological Survey of Sweden
- Geological Survey of Norway
- Geological Survey of Finland
- Mexican Geological Survey
- Zimbabwe Geological Survey
- Bureau de Recherches Géologiques et Minières - French Geological Survey
- Geological Survey of Canada in French Géologie des formations superficielles du Canada.
  - Geological Survey of Newfoundland and Labrador
  - Ontario Geological Survey
  - Alberta Geological Survey
- Geological Survey of Japan
- Geoscience Australia
  - Geological Survey of Western Australia
  - Geological Survey of Queensland
  - Geological Survey of South Australia
  - Geological Survey of Victoria
- New Zealand, GNS Science, a Crown Research Institute
- Geological Survey of India
- China Geological Survey
- Geological Survey of Slovenia
- Geological Survey of Austria
- Colombian Geological Survey
- Geological Survey of Ireland
- Geological Survey of Denmark and Greenland
- Geological Survey of Pakistan
- Geological Commission of the Cape of Good Hope
- Geological Survey of Tanzania
- Geological Survey of Belgium
- Geological Survey of Bangladesh
- Saudi Geological Survey
- Albanian Geological Survey
- State Geologic and Subsoil Survey of Ukraine

== See also ==
- Alluvium – Loose soil or sediment that is eroded and redeposited in a non-marine setting
- Colluvium – Loose, unconsolidated sediments deposited at the base of a hillslope
- Diluvium – Deposits created by outbursts of Pleistocene glacier-dammed lakes
