= Lundqvist =

Lundqvist (and its variant Lundkvist) is a Swedish surname.

== Geographical distribution ==
As of 2014, 88.7% of all known bearers of the surname Lundqvist were residents of Sweden (frequency 1:726), 3.8% of Denmark (1:9,699), 3.5% of Finland (1:10,236) and 1.4% of Norway (1:24,030).

In Sweden, the frequency of the surname was higher than national average (1:726) in the following counties:

1. Västerbotten County (1:257)
2. Norrbotten County (1:350)
3. Västernorrland County (1:434)
4. Uppsala County (1:593)
5. Gävleborg County (1:631)
6. Västmanland County (1:631)
7. Södermanland County (1:689)
8. Östergötland County (1:693)

In Denmark, the frequency of the surname was higher than national average (1:9,699) in the following regions:

1. Capital Region of Denmark (1:4,826)
2. Region Zealand (1:8,154)

In Finland, the frequency of the surname was higher than national average (1:10,236) in the following regions:

1. Åland (1:587)
2. Ostrobothnia (1:1,910)
3. Southwest Finland (1:6,333)
4. Uusimaa (1:6,401)
5. Lapland (1:10,193)

== People ==
- Alex Lundqvist (born 1972), Swedish male supermodel and professional paintball player
- Anja Lundqvist (born 1971), actress
- Cecilia Lundqvist (born 1971), Swedish videoartist
- Erik Lundqvist (1908 – 1963), Swedish Olympic gold medalist in javelin throw
- Gösta Lundquist (1892 – 1944), Swedish Olympic gold medalist in sailing
- Gösta Lundqvist (geologist) (1894 – 1967), Swedish geologist, father of Jan and Thomas
- Hanna Lundqvist (born 1990), Swedish footballer
- Henrik Lundqvist (born 1982), Swedish ice hockey goaltender
- Jan Lundqvist (1926–2024), Swedish geologist
- Jan-Erik Lundqvist (born 1937), Swedish tennis player
- Jens Lundqvist (born 1979), Swedish table tennis player
- Joel Lundqvist (born 1982), Swedish ice hockey player
- Karin Lundqvist (born 1981), volleyballer
- Linus Lundqvist (born 1999), Swedish racing driver
- Magnus Lundqvist (1891 – 1985), Swedish cartographer and publisher
- Olov Lundqvist (born 1988), Swedish ice hockey player
- Patrik Lundqvist (born 1984), Swedish politician
- Thomas Lundqvist (geologist) (born 1932), Swedish geologist
- Thomas Lundqvist (sailor) (born 1947), Swedish Olympic sailor

=== Lundkvist ===
- Eleonore Lundkvist (born 1988), Swedish politician
- Nils Lundkvist (born 2000), Swedish ice hockey player
- Svante Lundkvist (1919–1991), Swedish politician

== See also ==
- Lundquist
