= Geological survey =

Investigation of the geology in a region for creating a geological map

A geological survey is the systematic investigation of the geology beneath a given piece of ground for the purpose of creating a geological map or model. Geological surveying employs techniques from the traditional walk-over survey, studying outcrops and landforms, to intrusive methods, such as hand augering and machine-driven boreholes, to the use of geophysical techniques and remote sensing methods, such as aerial photography and satellite imagery. Such surveys may be undertaken by state, province, or national geological survey organizations to maintain the geological inventory and advance the knowledge of geosciences for the benefit of the nation. A geological survey map typically superimposes the surveyed extent and boundaries of geological units on a topographic map, together with information at points (such as measurements of orientation of bedding planes) and lines (such as the intersection of faults with the land surface). The maps and reports created by geological survey organisations generally aim for geographic continuity and completeness in establishing the spatial patterns of near-surface rock units. The map may include cross sections to illustrate the three-dimensional interpretation. Subsurface geological and geophysical maps, providing limited coverage of deeper geology (known, for example, from drilling for oil or gas), are maintained internally by major oil companies and regulators. Some geological survey organisations have collaborated with them to include subsurface geology in their systematic surveys, for example, the Geological Atlas of the Western Canada Sedimentary Basin. Subsurface maps typically depict the three-dimensional form of geological surfaces by means of contours and cross sections. Computer-based models are increasingly used to provide more comprehensive information storage and greater flexibility of presentation. In the United States, the 50 state surveys are coordinated by the Association of American State Geologists.

Some examples of national geological surveys are:

- British Geological Survey (BGS)
- Bureau de Recherches Géologiques et Minières (BRGM)
- Central Geological Survey (Taiwan)
- China Geological Survey
- Federal Institute for Geosciences and Natural Resources (BGR, Germany)
- Geological and Mining Institute of Spain
- Geological Survey of Austria
- Geological Survey of Canada
- Geological Survey of Denmark and Greenland
- Geological Survey of Finland
- Geological Survey of India
- Geological Survey of Ireland
- Geological Survey of Japan
- Geological Survey of Norway
- Geological Survey of Pakistan
- Geological Survey of Slovenia
- Geological Survey of Sweden
- Geoscience Australia
- Saudi Geological Survey
- Swisstopo (Switzerland)
- United States Geological Survey (USGS)

Individual states or provinces may also have a geological survey. Examples include:

- Alberta Geological Survey (Canada)
- California Geological Survey (USA)
- Delaware Geological Survey (USA)
- Geological Survey of Newfoundland and Labrador (Canada)
- Geological Survey of Queensland (Australia)
- Pennsylvania Geological Survey (USA)
- Utah Geological Survey (USA)
- Indiana Geological and Water Survey (USA)

== Types ==
- Cave survey, the three-dimensional mapping of caverns
- Geophysical survey, the systematic collection of geophysical data for spatial studies
- Hydrographic survey, the gathering of information about navigable waters for the purposes of safe navigation of vessels
- Soil survey, the mapping of the properties and varieties of soil in a given area

== See also ==
- Survey
- Prospecting
- OneGeology
- Systems geology
- Primary divisions of Surveying
- Mine survey
