= Curt Fredén =

Swedish geologist

- Born: 1937 (age 88–89)
- Citizenship: Sweden
- Education: Uppsala University; University of Gothenburg (Ph.D.)
- Awards: Geologist of the Year (2002)
- Scientific career
- Fields: Quaternary geology Sedimentology
- Workplaces: Geological Survey of Sweden

Curt Fredén (born 1937) is a Swedish Quaternary geologist. Most of his work has centered on the Holocene geology of the Baltic Sea. He was a member of the landslide commission (Swedish: Skredkommissionen) that existed from 1988 to 1996. In 2002 he was awarded the prize Geologist of the Year (Swedish: Årets geolog) by Naturvetarna. He has been editor for Berg och jord, the geology volume of the Swedish National Atlas and worked on various geological maps of Quaternary deposits. Fredén was one of geologists who helped make the High Coast a World Heritage Site.

Fredén has notably contributed to advance the understanding of the "enigmatic" Ancylus Lake and to discard the controversial Sveafallen at Degerfors as the lake's outlet.
