= Carl Caldenius =

Swedish geologist

- Born: 12 February 1887
- Died: 10 August 1961 (aged 74)
- Citizenship: Sweden
- Known for: Varve geochronology, Quaternary geology of Patagonia
- Scientific career
- Fields: Quaternary geology Geotechnical engineering
- Workplaces: Swedish State Railways; Geological Survey of Sweden; Stockholms högskola

Carl Caldenius (1887–1961), until 1920 known by the surname Carlzon, was a Swedish Quaternary geologist and geotechnical engineer. He is mostly known for his geochronological work in Patagonia.

Caldenius worked as geotechnical engineer for the Swedish State Railways until 1922 when he started to work full-time with his PhD thesis "Ragundasjöns stratigrafi och geokronologi" (Stratigraphy and geochronology of Lake Ragunda) that he defended in 1924. In 1925 he travelled to Argentina as part of a Swedish-Argentine collaboration to extend the clay varve chronology of Gerard De Geer to the Southern Hemisphere. After returning to Swedsen in 1930 he joined an expedition to Australia and New Zealand where he applied knowledge of varves to study the Carboniferous Karoo Ice Age.

== See also ==
- Carl Skottsberg
- José María Sobral
