= Vivi Vajda =

Swedish palaeontologist

- Vivi Vajda 2026.
- Born: 10 April 1964 (age 62)
- Education: Lund University
- Awards: Årets geolog 2010
- Scientific career
- Fields: Palaeontology
- Workplaces: Swedish Museum of Natural History
- Doctoral advisor: Kent Larsson; Nikolaos Solakius

Vivi Vajda is a Swedish palaeontologist. She is Professor and head of palaeobiology at the Swedish Museum of Natural History.

Through the study of microscopic fossils such as pollen, plankton, algae, and fungi, Vajda's research focuses on past vegetation changes, plant communities, and mass extinctions. She has also contributed to the understanding of the Cretaceous-Paleogene mass extinction. She is a member of the Royal Physiographic Society in Lund.

== Life and work ==
Vajda earned her BSc at Lund University, Sweden in 1989 and stayed there to obtain her PhD in 1998. She was a professor at Lund University from 2005 to 2015. She is currently the principal investigator of two research projects.

== Accolades ==
- Årets geolog (Geologist of the Year) awarded by Naturvetarna on 2010.

== Professional roles ==
- Chair of the Swedish National Committee for Geology, 2012–Present
- Chair of the International Geoscience Program, 2009-2012
- Chair of the Geological Society of Sweden, 2010-2012
- Chair of the Swedish IGCP Committee, 2006-2012
- Swedish representative of the European Federation of Geologists (EFG), HQ Brussels, 2006-2008
- Elected member of the Royal Physiographical Society in Lund, 2012
- Vice coordinator of the Centre of Excellence, the Linnaeus Centre LUCCI, 2009-2013
- Coordinator of the Linnaeus Centre LUCCI and Workpackage leader, 2014-2015
- Secretary of the Geological Society of Sweden, 2008-2009

== Selected publications ==
- Schulte et al., 2010. The Chicxulub Asteroid Impact and Mass Extinction at the Cretaceous-Paleogene Boundary. Science 327:5970 1214-1218. doi:10.1126/science.1177265
- Vajda, V., Raine, J. I., Hollis, C. J., 2001. Indication of Global Deforestation at the Cretaceous-Tertiary Boundary by New Zealand Fern Spike. Science 294:5547 1700-1702. doi:10.1126/science.1064706
- Vajda, V., McLoughlin, S., 2004. Fungal proliferation at the Cretaceous-Tertiary boundary. Science 303:5663 1489. doi:10.1126/science.1093807
- Vajda, V., Bercovici, A., 2014. The global vegetation pattern across the Cretaceous–Paleogene mass extinction interval: A template for other extinction events. Global and Planetary Change 122 29-49. doi:10.1016/j.gloplacha.2014.07.014
