= Ebba Hult de Geer =

Swedish geologist (1882–1969)

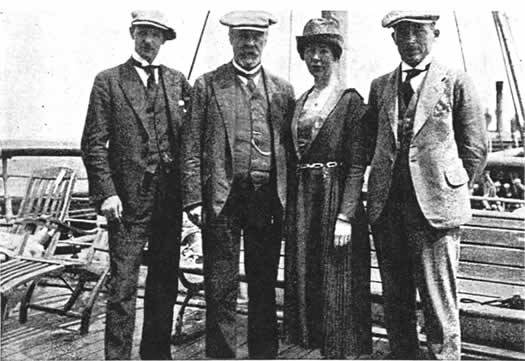
Ebba Hult de Geer (third from left) on a 1920 expedition to North America, with (left to right) Ragnar Lidén, Gerard De Geer, and Ernst Antevs

Ebba Hult de Geer (née Hult; 2 June 1882 – 28 July 1969) was a Swedish geologist known for her development of the geochronology of Sweden.

== Biography ==
Ebba Hult was born in Rödeby parish in Blekinge, Sweden. Hult was a teacher at Risbergska in Örebro 1902–04 and at Whitlockska in Stockholm 1904–07. She studied at Stockholm University 1906–08. She was a research assistant and secretary working with her husband, Gerard De Geer (1858–1943) whom she married in 1908.

De Geer was a professor of geology at Stockholm University and an influential participant in international geology. In 1924, De Geer retired from teaching and became the founder-director of the Geochronological Institute at Stockholm University. Following her husband's death in 1943, Hult became leader of the Stockholm University Geochronological Institute.

Hult managed to create her own role as researcher in geochronology. She used varved clay in glacial lakes as evidence for ancient climates (paleoclimatology) and studied similar deposits worldwide to establish a global climate history.
