= Sven Gavelin =

Swedish geologist

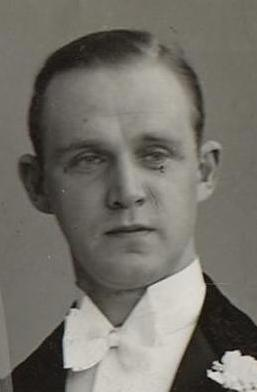
- Born: 31 January 1909; Solna
- Died: 9 October 1991 (aged 82)
- Citizenship: Sweden
- Known for: contributions to Precambrian geology, ore geology and geology of Norrland
- Father: Axel Gavelin
- Scientific career
- Fields: Geology
- Workplaces: Stockholms högskola Geological Survey of Sweden

Sven Gavelin (1909-1991) was Swedish geologist active at Stockholms högskola and the Geological Survey of Sweden. As a geologist he worked chiefly with Precambrian events and rocks. Sven Gavelin made significant contributions to the understanding of the ore deposits of Västerbotten. Some other topics he investigated include the Almesåkra Group.

He was the son of Axel Gavelin, who was also a geologist. Sven Gavelin was also a member of the Royal Physiographic Society in Lund and the Royal Swedish Academy of Sciences.
