= Thomas Lundqvist =

Thomas Lundqvist may refer to:

- Thomas Lundqvist (geologist) (born 1932), Swedish geologist
- Thomas Lundqvist (sailor), Swedish Olympic sailor
