= Else Marie Friis =

Danish botanist and paleontologist (born 1947)

- Born: 18 June 1947 (age 79); Holstebro, Denmark
- Known for: Palaeoecology
- Scientific career
- Fields: botany, paleontology
- Thesis: Microcarpological Studies of Middle Miocene Floras of Western Denmark
- Author abbrev. (botany): E.M.Friis

Else Marie Friis (born 18 June 1947) is a Danish botanist and paleontologist. She is Professor Emerita in the Department of Geoscience at Aarhus University. Her work has been fundamental in the phylogenetic analysis of angiosperms, with widespread application to reproductive biology.

== Education and early life ==
The daughter of a bookseller Poul Friis and Marie Møller, she was born in Holstebro, and grew up in Skive, graduating from local school Viborg Katedralskole in 1966. She worked as an au-pair in Paris for a year, becoming interested in geology whilst her brother Henrik was a student in the subject. This inspired her to become an assistant teacher in botany and geology in 1971.

In 1975 she earned a Magister's degree in science and in 1980 a Licentiate's degree in science, both from Aarhus University.

== Research and career ==
Her area of interest is the reproductive biology, phylogeny and palaeoecology of flowering plants based on plant reproductive organs from the Cretaceous period.

Early on in her career she began research into lignite, being involved in fieldwork in the lignite mines in Central Jutland from 1968 to 1972. She was interested in the ecology and climate of Denmark in the middle Miocene, writing her Licentiate thesis on the subject. She became interested in discovering whether early fossil flowering plants could be identified. Fossilised pollen discovered in the 1960s had identified that flowering plants originated during the Cretaceous, but the nature of the plants themselves remained unknown. Most parts of plants, especially the flowers that are needed to identify species, are made of very delicate tissue that is unlikely to become fossilised. It was also considered that the first flowers were likely to be large structures like most modern flowers, adding to the likelihood that they would not become fossilised. The first Cretaceous flower was found by Bruce H. Tiffney in the 1970s in sediment from Martha's Vineyard in the USA, but was seen as an exceptional discovery. Friis and her collaborators made the technical decision to seek very small pieces of charcoal within likely soft rocks through sieving the crumbled sediment, and then using a microscope to view the resulting fragments. This was based on the hypothesis that charcoal formed during natural fires would be much more likely to be preserved intact. In this way she found very small flowers, only a few millimetres in length, that were around 80 million years old. Through her research network that included Peter Crane and Kaj Pedersen, she collaborated with Annie Skarby to locate and identify many early Cretaceous flowers from southern Sweden. In further sediments in the USA and Portugal they were able to local fossilised charcoal flowers that were 120 million years old, extending the origin of flowering plants to earlier in the Cretaceous. These appeared to belong to the Chloranthaceae, a group that turned out to be a major part of the flora at that time but is now only represented by a few species. The technique was subsequently adopted by others to find ancient flowers in sediments around the world.

From 1980 to 1981 she was in London as a British Council Research Scholar, switching research interests following the co-discovery with Swedish scientist Annie Skarby of rare fossilised flowers from the Cretaceous period that were so well preserved that they could be placed within the modern order Saxifragales.

She returned to Aarhus University in 1981, co-publishing a book "The Origins of Angiosperms and Their Biological Consequences" in 1987. She became the head of palaeobotany at the Swedish Museum of Natural History in Stockholm later that year. During her career she has characterised and named over 200 species of fossil flowering plants.

In 1999 she was awarded an honorary doctorate from Uppsala University, and has been a visiting professor at Zurich University.

== Awards and Associations ==
Friis is a member of the:

- American Academy of Arts and Sciences
- Royal Danish Academy of Sciences and Letters
- Royal Swedish Academy of Science
- Royal Physiographic Society in Lund, Sweden
- Norwegian Academy of Science and Letters
- Chinese Academy of Sciences

and a

- Foreign Member of the Royal Society

She has received the:

- Hans Gram Medal from the Royal Danish Academy of Sciences and Letters in 1985
- Nils Rosén Linné Prize in botany from the Royal Physiographic Society, Sweden in 1992
- Rolf Dahlgren Prize in botany from the Royal Physiographic Society, Sweden in 2005
- Sweden's Geologist of the Year accolade from Naturvetarna 2007
- Denmark's Geology Prize 2011 with Kaj Raunsgaard Pedersen from the Geological Survey of Denmark and Greenland
- Linnaeus gold medal from the Royal Swedish Academy of Sciences in 2014
- Knight 1st Class of the Order of the Polar Star
- Lapworth Medal from the Palaeontological Association in 2023

In addition, she was named Geologist of the year in 2005 by the Swedish Association of Scientists.
