= Svante Björck =

Swedish geologist

- Citizenship: Sweden
- Awards: Geologist of the Year (2006); Björkénska priset (2007); Munthepris (2017); IPA lifetime achievement award (2018)
- Scientific career
- Fields: Quaternary geology
- Workplaces: Lund University

Svante Björck is a Swedish Quaternary geologist and professor emeritus active at Lund University. In 2006 he was named Geologist of the Year by Geosektionen of Naturvetarna.
