= Australian Government Linked Data Working Group =

Advisory group of the Australian government

The Australian Government Linked Data Working Group is an informal, advisory working group within Australia government, self-tasked "to meet the Linked Data challenges facing the Australian government". The Group was established in August 2012 and operates with monthly or more regular meetings.

== Membership ==
Membership of the group is not heavily restricted and is open to any member of Australian government (any level). Private sector individuals may attend meetings as guests.

Currently, there is regular attendance of members of the following Australian government departments:

- Australian Bureau of Statistics
- Australian National University
- CSIRO
- Department of Finance
- Services Australia
- Digital Transformation Agency
- Geoscience Australia
- National Archives of Australia
- Department of Natural Resources and Mines, Manufacturing and Regional and Rural Development (primarily the Geological Survey of Queensland)

For 2020–2022, the co-chairs of the Group are Armin Haller (ANU), Nataliya Katsman (Tas. State Growth), Nicholas Car (ANU) & John Machin (Finance)

For 2019/2020, the co-chairs of the Group were Armin Haller (ANU), Brigette Metzler (DHS), Nicholas Car (QDNRME) & John Machin (Finance)

== Activities ==
The Group both conducts informal advice on Linked Data matters to interested members of Australian government and provides technical expertise for information requests such as the recent Data Availability and Use inquiry (see the Group's Submission 46). The Group regularly attends Australian conferences and workshops in the areas of eLearning and data, for example the eResearch Australasia Conference series where they presented on "collaborating across agencies to work together on systems, vocabularies, ontologies and datasets".

The group also operates some Linked Data systems, such as a Persistent URI service, and assists Australian government with Linked Data asset publication.

To date several significant data models for Australian government, such as the Australian Government Records Interoperability Framework (AGRIF) have been published via the Group's resources.
