= Gerard De Geer =

Swedish geologist (1858–1943)

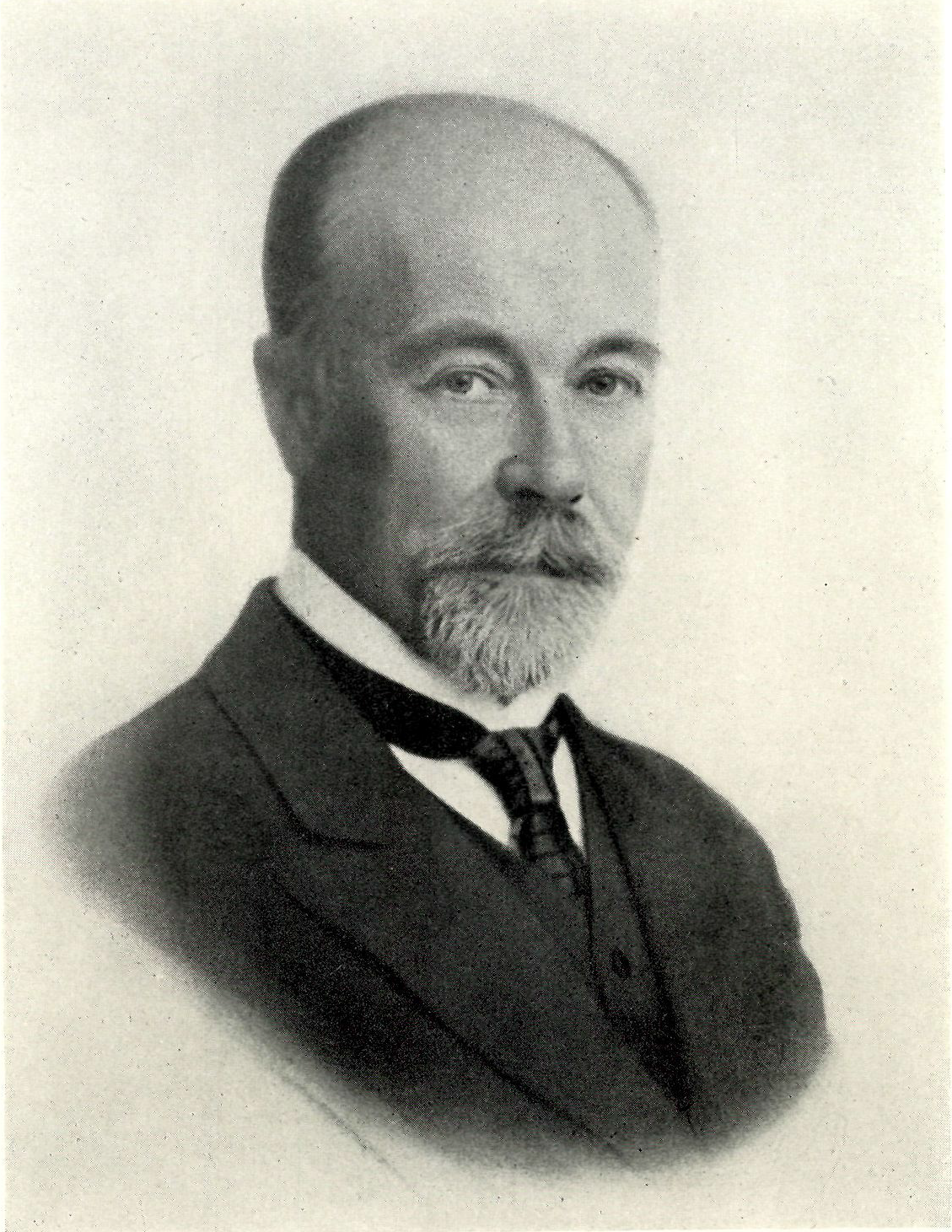
- Born: 20 November 1858; Stockholm, Sweden
- Died: 24 July 1943 (aged 84); Stockholm, Sweden
- Citizenship: Swedish
- Education: Uppsala University
- Known for: Varve geochronology
- Children: Sten De Geer
- Awards: Vega Medal (1915); Björkénska priset (1917); Wollaston Medal (1920)
- Scientific career
- Fields: Quaternary geology
- Workplaces: Stockholm University
- Doctoral students: Ernst Antevs

Baron Gerard Jacob De Geer ForMemRS (20 November 1858 – 24 July 1943) was a Swedish geologist who made significant contributions to Quaternary geology, particularly geomorphology and geochronology. De Geer is best known for his work on varves. In 1890 De Geer was the first to apply the name Ancylus Lake to the Baltic paleolake discovered by Henrik Munthe. He subsequently participated in the protracted scientific controversy surrounding this lake.

== Biography ==
Baron Gerard Jacob De Geer comes from a well-known Swedish aristocratic family of Brabant origin, who had emigrated to Sweden in the early seventeenth century. His family included prominent industrialists and politicians. His father Louis and older brother Gerhard Louis served as the Prime Minister of Sweden.

Gerard Jacob was born on 2 October 1858, in Stockholm in the family of Baron Louis Gerhard de Geer, at that time the first Minister of Justice in the Swedish government, and Carolina de Geer, née Countess Wachtmeister. Since 1869 he studied at primary school, and since 1873 - at the Stockholm gymnasium. In 1877, de Geer entered Uppsala University. In May 1879 he graduated and received a Bachelor of Arts degree.

In 1878, De Geer became an employee of the Geological Survey of Sweden, initially freelance, then, since 1882, as an assistant to a geologist, and since 1885, a full-time geologist. At this time he started to study the late Quaternary deposits and landforms of southern Sweden. In 1897, he left his job in the geological service for the position of professor of general and historical geology at Stockholm University.

In 1882, on the recommendation of Otto Martin Torell, de Geer participated in the Swedish expedition to Spitsbergen as part of the first International Polar Year as a staff geologist. This marks the beginning of many years of research on the modern glaciation of the Svalbard archipelago: in total he took part in six expeditions to Svalbard (1882, 1896, 1899, 1901, 1908 and 1910).

Gerard de Geer remained a lecturer at the Department of Geology at the University of Stockholm from 1897 to 1924. At the university, he served as rector (1902-1910) and vice-chancellor from (1911-1924). In addition, De Geer was a member of the Swedish Parliament from 1900 to 1905.

The pinnacle of de Geer's scientific career can be considered the receipt of the presidency of the X International Geological Congress, held in Stockholm in 1910. At first he took part in the preparation of the Congress as vice-chairman of the preparatory committee, and from May 1907 - as chairman of the executive committee. Within the framework of the congress, he delivered the now classic lecture "A geochronology of the last 12000 years". He began this lecture with such words "Geology is the history of the earth, but hitherto it has been a history without years." At the congress De Geer formally introduced the term varve defining it as any annual sedimentary layer, and also proposed that the term geochronology be restricted to varve dating, other existing techniques being less accurate and precise. By then, observations of the stratigraphic relationship between varved sediment and recessional moraines, and the correlation of varve sequences between geographically distant sites, added more compelling evidence to De Geer's essentially circumstantial speculation. The geological community accepted that the couplets were unlikely to represent any period other than the year. In addition, before the start of the Congress, De Geer conducted an excursion for 65 delegates from 14 countries, within the framework of which he examined the Dicksonfjorden on Spitsbergen.

== Main research areas ==
De Geer's early studies of raised beaches, used to reconstruct glacio-isostatic sea level changes, and his mapping of glacial moraines to reconstruct the extent of the last Scandinavian ice sheet and its pattern of deglaciation (the particular type of moraine he studied is now referred to as De Geer moraine), were well received. However, De Geer is most famous for discovering varves and pioneering their use in geochronology.

During fieldwork in 1878, De Geer noticed that the appearance of laminated sediments deposited in glacial lakes at the margin of the retreating Scandinavian ice sheet at the end of the last ice age, closely resembled tree-rings. In his best known work Geochronologia Sueccia, published in 1940, De Geer wrote "From the obvious similarity with the regular, annual rings of the trees I got at once the impression that both ought to be annual deposits" (1940, p. 13).

While this observation was not new, De Geer was the first geologist to exploit its potential application. De Geer called these annual sedimentary layers varves and throughout the 1880s further developed his theory, publishing a brief outline of his discovery in 1882, which he followed with a presentation to the Swedish Geological Society in 1884. It was not until 1910, at the International Geological Congress, that De Geer's pioneering work reached the wider international scientific community.

=== The Swedish Time Scale ===
In 1897 De Geer was appointed professor of geology at Stockholm University, and went on to become the university's president from 1902 to 1910. With the help of numerous students from both Stockholm and Uppsala, De Geer began to piece together short, but overlapping, varve sequences in south east Sweden to create a longer year-by-year chronology of glacial retreat for the Lateglacial period. The urban expansion of Stockholm provided perfect conditions for De Geer and his colleagues, who made good use of numerous exposures of laminated sediment in the many pits and cuttings that exposed the glacial lake sediments of the Baltic basin. Estuarine sediments exposed along the valley of the Angermanalven River, allowed De Geer to further extend the chronology into the early Holocene. The resulting varve chronology was called the Swedish Time Scale, and geologists outside Sweden soon followed suit using varved sediments to build high-resolution chronologies of glacial retreat, most notably Matti Sauramo in Finland.

== Global expeditions, teleconnections, and controversy ==
De Geer firmly believed the main control on varve sedimentation was solar radiation acting on glacier meltwater production, and that consequently, varved sediments represented a "..gigantic, natural self-registering thermograph" (De Geer 1926) and varve curves (varve thickness plotted against varve number or year), which he often referred to as "solar curves", a reliable proxy for past changes in solar radiation. Ultimately, De Geer hoped his studies of varves would explain the fundamental cause of Ice Ages - "If the last glaciation everywhere should show to be synchronous and the origin of the last Ice Age thus to be of a general nature, the assumption of a cosmic cause would scarcely be avoidable."

In 1915 De Geer matched, or 'teleconnected", varve curves from Sweden to varve curves from Finland and Norway. This first attempt at long-distance correlation marked the start of two decades travelling around the world by De Geer and his colleagues, searching out varve sequences for potential teleconnections. In 1920 De Geer travelled to North America with his wife and two assistants, Ernst Antevs and Ragnar Liden. Antevs remained in North America at the end of the trip, where he worked on the North American varve chronology. Further trips included Erik Norin's visit to the Himalayas (1924–1925), Erik Nilsson's visit to East Africa (1927–28), and Carl Caldenius' visit to South America (1925–1929), and later to New Zealand (1932–34).

However, by the mid-1930s De Geer's teleconnections had become the subject of increasing criticism from his former student Ernst Antevs. Antevs correctly argued that the teleconnections were bad science, and that De Geer's Trans-Atlantic correlations were inaccurate. De Geer felt his position was being caricatured and intentionally misunderstood by Antevs, but did little scientifically to rebuff the criticisms levelled at him.

In 1924 De Geer retired from teaching and became the founder-director of the Geochronological Institute at Stockholm University.

== Geochronologia Suecica Principles ==
In 1940, De Geer published his longest and best-known work Geochronologia Suecica Principles, in which he presented part of the Swedish Time Scale in detail, and expounded upon his theories and work regarding varves.

Almost immediately after the publication of Geochronologia Suecica Principles De Geer's Swedish Time Scale underwent the first of many revisions, as other geologists became involved in the study of varves and more sites were examined.

However, international interest in varves diminished. The bitter dispute between De Geer and Antevs, coupled with the advent of new dating techniques, most importantly radiocarbon dating, showed varves in a bad light.

De Geer died in Stockholm on 24 July 1943. His wife, Ebba Hult de Geer, continued to publish his work, and add to it, into the 1950s.

== Awards and recognition ==
De Geer's contributions to geology were recognised in the UK, where the Geological Society awarded De Geer the Wollaston Medal in 1920, and the Royal Society elected De Geer a foreign member in 1930. The ancient DeGeer Sea in modern-day Maritime Canada and the Gulf of Maine was named in his honour. The Swedish Antarctic Expedition (1901–1904) named a glacier on South Georgia Island in the southern Atlantic Ocean after De Geer. The British would later rename the glacier Harker Glacier after a contemporary English geologist, Alfred Harker.

The valley of De Geerdalen at Spitsbergen, Svalbard is named after him.

== De Geer from a modern perspective ==
De Geer's most significant contribution to Quaternary science was unquestionably the identification of varves, and his recognition of their potential in establishing annual chronologies of past climatic and environmental change. The Swedish Time Scale was the most precise and accurate geological timescale of its day, and it is still being improved and added to today. His insistence that varves represented quantifiable proxies for past climate has since been borne out to a degree, but the relationship between varve thickness and hydrometeorological conditions is not as simple as he presumed. Varves have recently experienced a renaissance as methods and techniques of study have improved, and varves are now regularly used to calibrate radiocarbon timescales.

In many ways, De Geer's concerns mirror that of modern Quaternary geologists and palaeoclimatologists, particularly his recognition of the need for high-resolution natural archives of past change, and the importance of testing whether global change is synchronous. De Geer's principle failing was his faith in teleconnections, where his findings were clearly influenced by his preconceptions. His belief that variations in solar radiation were the principal agent of all climate change has also since been shown to be incorrect. Nevertheless, De Geer asked all the right questions, and his errors can be attributed as much to over-enthusiasm and a single-minded passion, as they can to bad science.

== Selected English language works ==
- De Geer, G. (1912), A geochronology of the last 12000 years. Congr. Géol. Int. Stockholm 1910, C.R., 241–253.
- De Geer, G (1921). "Correlation of late-glacial clay varves in North America with the Swedish timescale". Geol. Förhandl., Stockholm. 43: 70–73. doi:10.1080/11035892109443889.
- De Geer, G (1926). "On the solar curve as dating the Ice Age, the New York moraine and Niagara falls through the Swedish time scale". Geogr. Annaler. (Stockholm). 8: 253–284. doi:10.2307/519727. JSTOR 519727.
- De Geer, G (1927). "Late glacial clay varves in Argentina measured by Dr. Carl Caldenius, dated and connected with the solar curve through the Swedish time scale". Geogr. Annaler (Stockholm). 9: 1–8. doi:10.2307/519677. JSTOR 519677.
- De Geer, G (1934). "Geology and geochronology". Geogr. Annaler (Stockholm). 1: 1–52.
- De Geer, G (1935a). "Dating of the Ice Age in Scotland". Transactions of the Geological Society of Glasgow. 19 (2): 335–339. doi:10.1144/transglas.19.2.335. S2CID 219189556.
- De Geer, G (1935b). "Dating of Late-Glacial clay varves in Scotland". Proceedings of the Royal Society of Edinburgh. 55: 23–26. doi:10.1017/s0370164600014322.
- De Geer, G (1935). "Teleconnections contra so-called telecorrelations". Geol. Fören. Förhandl. 57 (2): 341–346. doi:10.1080/11035893509445981.
- De Geer, G. (1940), Geochronologia Suecia Principles .K.Svenska Vetenskapsakad. Handl.

== Sources ==
- Spjeldnaes, N. (1972) pp. 329–330 in Gillispie, C. C. (Ed.) Dictionary of Scientific Biography, American Council of Learned Societies, Charles's Scribner's Sons Publishers New York ISBN 0-684-10116-5.
- Bailey, E. B. (1943). "Gerard Jacob De Geer. 1858-1943". Obituary Notices of Fellows of the Royal Society. 4 (12): 475–481. doi:10.1098/rsbm.1943.0017.
- Cato, I.; Stevens, R.L. (2011). "Gerard De Geer – a pioneer in Quaternary geology in Scandinavia" (PDF). Baltica. 5 (1). Vilnos: 1–22. ISSN 0067-3064. Archived from the original (PDF) on 3 April 2015.
- Madsen, Victor (1943). "Gerard Jakob De Geer (obituary)" (PDF). Medd. Fra Dansk Geol. Forening. (in Danish). København.
- Sander, M (2003). "Climatic signals and frequencies in the Swedish Time Scale, River Ångermanälven, Central Sweden". Lundqua Thesis (Dissertation). 43 (LUNDQUA ed.): 9–11. ISSN 0281-3033. Archived from the original on 12 March 2016.
