= Finnish Reflection Experiment =

Finnish Reflection Experiment (FIRE) is a reflection seismic experiment that was carried out in collaboration with the Geological Survey of Finland, Seismological Institute of Finland (University of Helsinki), Geophysics Division of the University of Oulu, the Geophysical Observatory of Sodankylä, and Russian company Spetsgeofysika during the years 2001–2004. The FIRE-profiles comprise in total over 2100 kilometers of high-resolution seismic reflection profiles that crosscut all the prominent units of the bedrock of Finland. The budget of the FIRE-project was ca. 17 million euros, most of which was funded through reimbursements of the Russian national debt to Finland as scientific equipment and services.

Seismic probing was carried out on four profiles across Finland. The FIRE 1 and 2 transect the southern and central Finland from northeast to southwest and FIRE 3 from east to west. FIRE 4 transects the bedrock of northern Finland from north to south. The seismic reflection results have been used to refine the interpretations of deep crustal structures of the Baltic Shield.

The results from the experiment were released into open access in 2017 under the auspices of the OpenFIRE project by the Institute of Seismology at the University of Helsinki, and in 2021 were made part of the FIN-EPOS data archive.
