= Axel Gavelin =

Swedish geologist

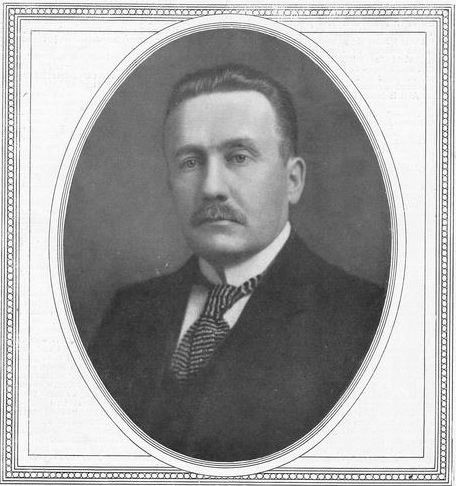
- Born: 4 October 1875; Vilhelmina, Sweden
- Died: 14 June 1947 (aged 71); Stockholm County, Sweden
- Citizenship: Sweden
- Education: Uppsala University
- Children: Sven Gavelin
- Scientific career
- Fields: Geology
- Workplaces: Geological Survey of Sweden

Axel Olof Gavelin (4 October 1875 – 14 June 1947) was a Swedish geologist. He was director of the Geological Survey of Sweden. He studied both ice-dammed lakes and Precambrian rocks across Sweden.

== Biography ==
Axel Olof Gavelin was born in the parish of Vilhelmina in Västerbotten County, Sweden. Gavelin earned a Ph.D. at Uppsala University in 1905. He was employed as acting geologist at the Swedish Geological Survey in 1902, became state geologist in 1903, acting head in 1914 and director general in 1916–41. He carried out his most important geological work in Sweden's bedrock areas and mountain range.

He became a member of the Swedish Academy of Sciences and of the Academy of Agriculture in 1922, of the Physiographic Society in Lund in 1924 and of the Academy of Engineering Sciences in 1925. In 1931, Gavelin became chairman of the Swedish Society for Nature Conservation. He died during 1947 at Engelbrekt Parish in Stockholm County, Sweden.
