= Dmytro Kashchuk =

Ukrainian entrepreneur (born 1983)

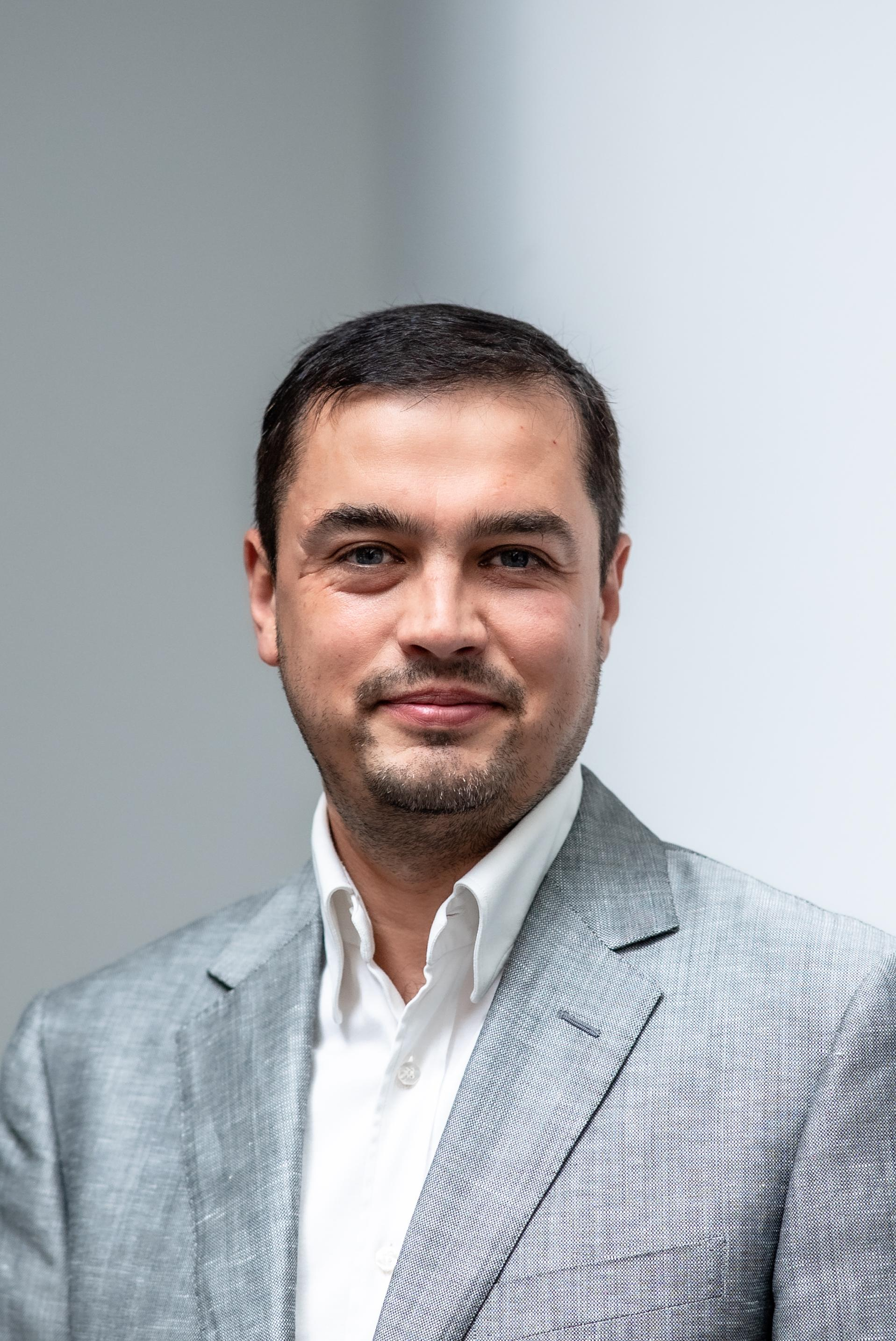
- Born: Дмитро Анатолійович Кащук; May 4, 1983 (age 43)
- Occupations: entrepreneur, investor, former head of State Geologic and Subsoil Survey of Ukraine

Dmytro Anatoliiovych Kashchuk (Ukrainian: Дмитро Анатолійович Кащук; born May 4, 1983) is a Ukrainian entrepreneur and investor, member of CEO Club Ukraine, and former Head of the State Geologic and Subsoil Survey of Ukraine (2014-2015), and expert in the field of subsoil use. He also served as Chairman of the Subsoil Use Committee at the European Business Association from 2022 to 2025..

== Biography ==
Dmytro Kashchuk was born May 4, 1983, in Moscow. He spent his childhood in Lviv. From 1990 to 2000 he studied at the secondary school No. 82 in Lviv. From 2000 to 2005, he studied at the Lviv Polytechnic National University, Institute of Economics and Management, specialty “International Economics”.

In 2004, he entered the University of Lviv, Institute of Postgraduate Education, specialty “Jurisprudence”. He graduated from the university in 2008. From 2011 to 2014, he studied at the National Academy for Public Administration, specialty “Public administration”.

From 2008 to 2010, he was Deputy Head of the department, Head of the Export Development Division of the Foreign Economic Policy Department of the Ministry for Development of Economy and Trade.

Since 2013 — Deputy Director of LLC "Fiakr-Lviv". Since 2014 he worked as a representative of Chevron in the Western region of Ukraine.

From May 21, 2014, to December 10, 2014, he was in the position of the Chairman of the State Service of Geology and Subsoil of Ukraine.

From 2017 to 2021, he is a co-owner of property rights, a developer and co-author of the settlement and information complex "Rikom".

From 2018 to 2021 he is the head of the public organization “Science Exploration Mining”. Kashchuk contributes columns to "NV" and "Ekonomichna Pravda" and implements investment projects in the field of subsoil use.

In 2022, he led the Subsoil Use Committee of the European Business Association, which started operating in September 2022. He served as Chairman of the Committee through 2025. The committee unites companies engaged in the extraction of minerals, whose representatives are professional advisers in the field of subsoil use and have a common vision of transforming the industry into an investment-attractive branch of the Ukrainian economy.
