= Gösta Lundqvist =

Swedish geologist

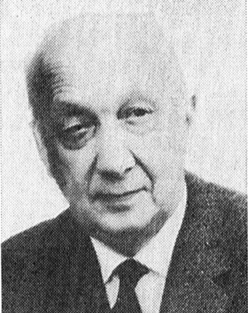
- Born: 24 March 1894; Stockholm, Sweden
- Died: 30 June 1967 (aged 73); Stockholm, Sweden
- Education: Stockholm University
- Scientific career
- Fields: Geology, Limnology
- Workplaces: Geological Survey of Sweden
- Doctoral advisor: Gerard De Geer

Gösta Lundqvist (March 24, 1894 – June 30, 1967) was a Swedish geologist. Lundqvist's research was mainly focused on the Quaternary soils, but he was also a pioneer in limnology.

== Biography ==
Adolf Gösta Lundqvist was born in Hedvig Eleonora parish in Stockholm, Sweden. Lundqvist received his geological training under Quaternary geologist, Gerard De Geer and state geologist Lennart von Post (1884–1951). Lundqvist studied at Stockholm University, where he received a bachelor of philosophy in 1917, licentiate in philosophy in 1919 and doctor of philosophy in 1925. He was active in the Swedish Geological Survey as the first state geologist 1920–1961 and was named professor in 1957. He was elected a member of the Royal Swedish Academy of Sciences in 1951.

== Personal life ==
From 1924 he was married to Disa Rydeman (1897–1989). He was the father of two sons who became geologists: Jan Lundqvist and Thomas Lundqvist.
