= Jan Lundqvist =

Swedish geologist (1926–2024)

- Born: 4 August 1926
- Died: 8 May 2024 (aged 97); Danderyd, Sweden
- Awards: Årets geolog (1998)
- Scientific career
- Fields: Geology, Quaternary science
- Workplaces: Geological Survey of Sweden; Stockholm University

Jan Lundqvist (4 August 1926 – 8 May 2024) was a Swedish geologist and considered among the foremost authorities on the Quaternary geology of Fennoscandia.

He was son of Gösta Lundqvist and brother of Thomas Lundqvist, both of whom are geologists. Jan Lundqvist worked at Geological Survey of Sweden from 1951 to 80 and obtained a Ph.D. degree in Quaternary geology at Stockholms högskola in 1958, becoming also a teacher in that institution. He died in Danderyd on 8 May 2024, at the age of 97.
