= Varve =

Annual layer of sediment or sedimentary rock

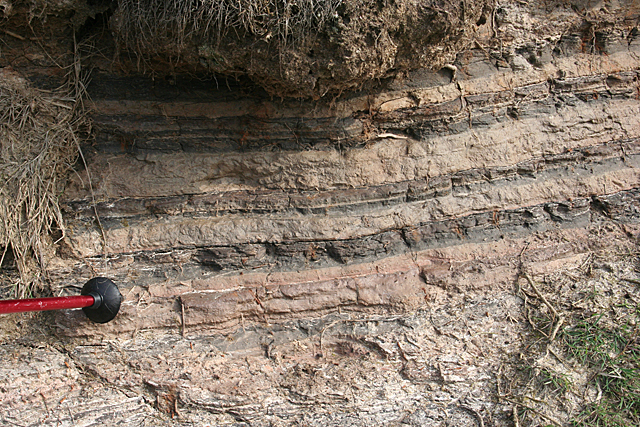
Pleistocene glacial lake varves at Sandend Bay in Scotland

A varve is an annual layer of sediment or sedimentary rock.

The word 'varve' derives from the Swedish word varv whose meanings and connotations include 'revolution', 'in layers', and 'circle'.

Of the many rhythmites in the geological record, varves are one of the most important and illuminating in studies of past climate change. Varves are amongst the smallest-scale events recognised in stratigraphy.

An annual layer can be highly visible because the particles washed into the layer in the spring when there is greater flow strength are much coarser than those deposited later in the year. This forms a pair of layers—one coarse and one fine—for each annual cycle. Varves form only in fresh or brackish water, because the high levels of salt in normal sea water coagulate the clay into coarse grains. Since the saline waters leave coarse particles all year, it is nearly impossible to distinguish the individual layers in salt waters. Indeed, clay flocculation occurs at high ionic strength due to the collapse of the clay electrical double layer (EDL), which decreases the electrostatic repulsion between negatively charged clay particles.

== Etymology ==
The word 'varve' derives from the Swedish word varv whose meaning and connotations include 'revolution', 'in layers', and 'circle'. The term first appeared as Hvarfig lera (varved clay) on the first map produced by the Geological Survey of Sweden in 1862. Initially, "varve" referred to each of the separate components comprising a single annual layer in glacial lake sediments, but at the 1910 Geological Congress, the Swedish geologist Gerard De Geer (1858–1943) proposed a new formal definition, where varve means the whole of any annual sedimentary layer. More recently introduced terms such as 'annually laminated' are synonymous with varve.

== History of varve research ==
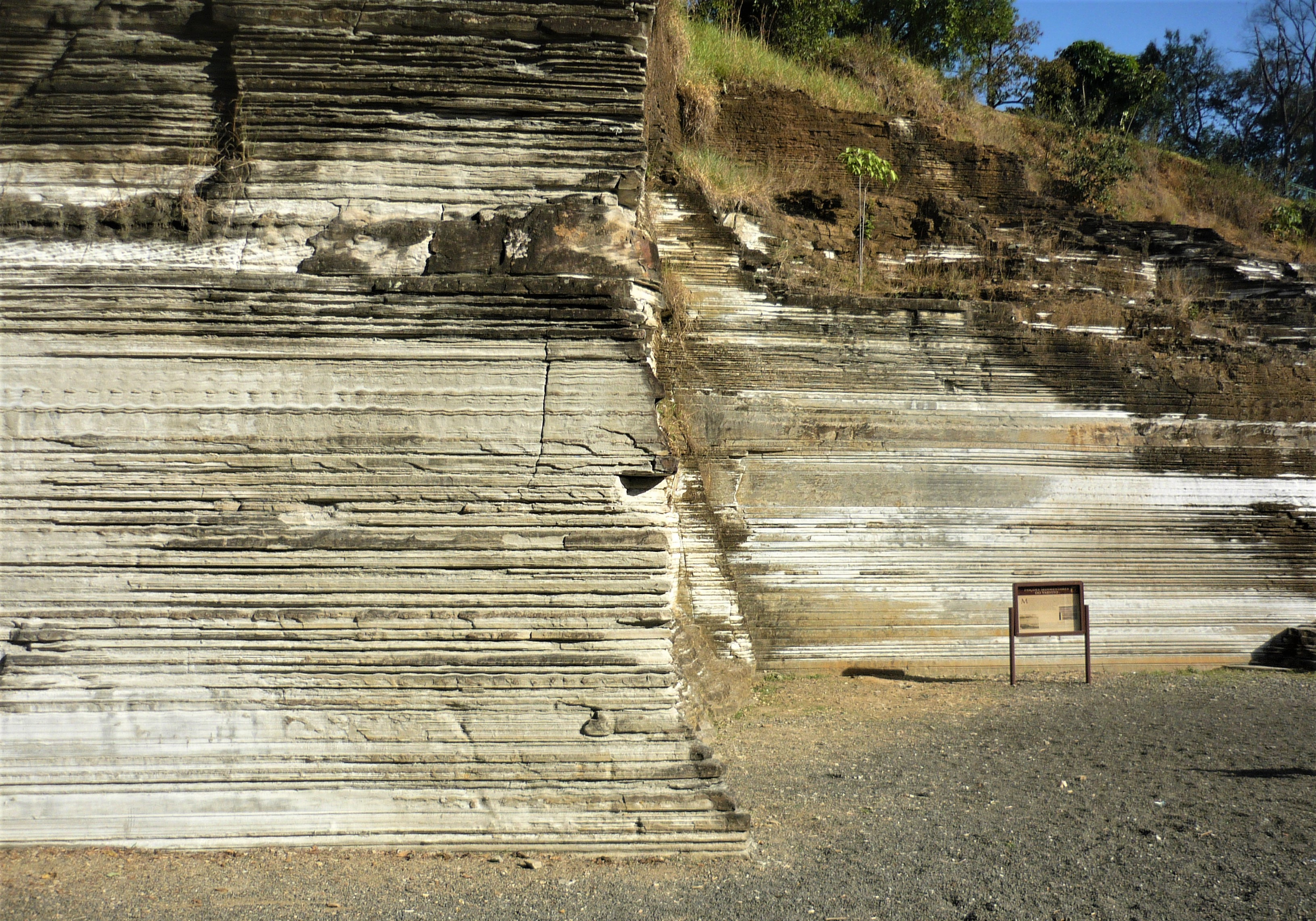
Varves in a geological park in Itu, Brazil

Although the term varve was not introduced until the late nineteenth century, the concept of an annual rhythm of deposition is at least two centuries old. In the 1840s, Edward Hitchcock suspected laminated sediment in North America could be seasonal, and in 1884 Warren Upham postulated that light-dark laminated couplets represented a single year's deposition. Despite these earlier forays, the chief pioneer and populariser of varve research was Gerard De Geer. While working for the Geological Survey of Sweden, De Geer noticed a close visual similarity between the laminated sediments he was mapping, and tree-rings. This prompted him to suggest the coarse-fine couplets frequently found in the sediments of glacial lakes were annual layers.

The first varve chronology was constructed by De Geer in Stockholm in the late 19th century. Further work soon followed, and a network of sites along the east coast of Sweden was established. The varved sediments exposed in these sites had formed in glaciolacustrine and glacimarine conditions in the Baltic basin as the last ice sheet retreated northwards. By 1914, De Geer had discovered that it was possible to compare varve sequences across long distances by matching variations in varve thickness, and distinct marker laminae. However, this discovery led De Geer and many of his co-workers into making incorrect correlations, which they called 'teleconnections', between continents, a process criticised by other varve pioneers like Ernst Antevs.

In 1924, the Geochronological Institute, a special laboratory dedicated to varve research was established. De Geer and his co-workers and students made trips to other countries and continents to investigate varved sediments. Ernst Antevs studied sites from Long Island, U.S.A. to Lake Timiskaming and Hudson Bay, Canada, and created a North American varve chronology. Carl Caldenius visited Patagonia and Tierra del Fuego, and Erik Norin visited central Asia. By this stage, other geologists were investigating varve sequences, including Matti Sauramo who constructed a varve chronology of the last deglaciation in Finland.

1940 saw the publication of a now classic scientific paper by De Geer, the Geochronologia Suecica, in which he presented the Swedish Time Scale, a floating varve chronology for ice recession from Skåne to Indalsälven. Ragnar Lidén made the first attempts to link this time scale with the present day. Since then, there have been revisions as new sites are discovered, and old ones reassessed. At present, the Swedish varve chronology is based on thousands of sites, and covers 13,200 varve years.

In 2008, although varves were considered likely to give similar information to dendrochronology, they were considered "too uncertain" for use on a long-term timescale. However, by 2012, “missing” varves in the Lake Suigetsu sequence were identified in the Lake Suigetsu 2006 Project by overlapping multiple cores and improved varve counting techniques, extending the timescale to 52,800 years.

== Formation ==
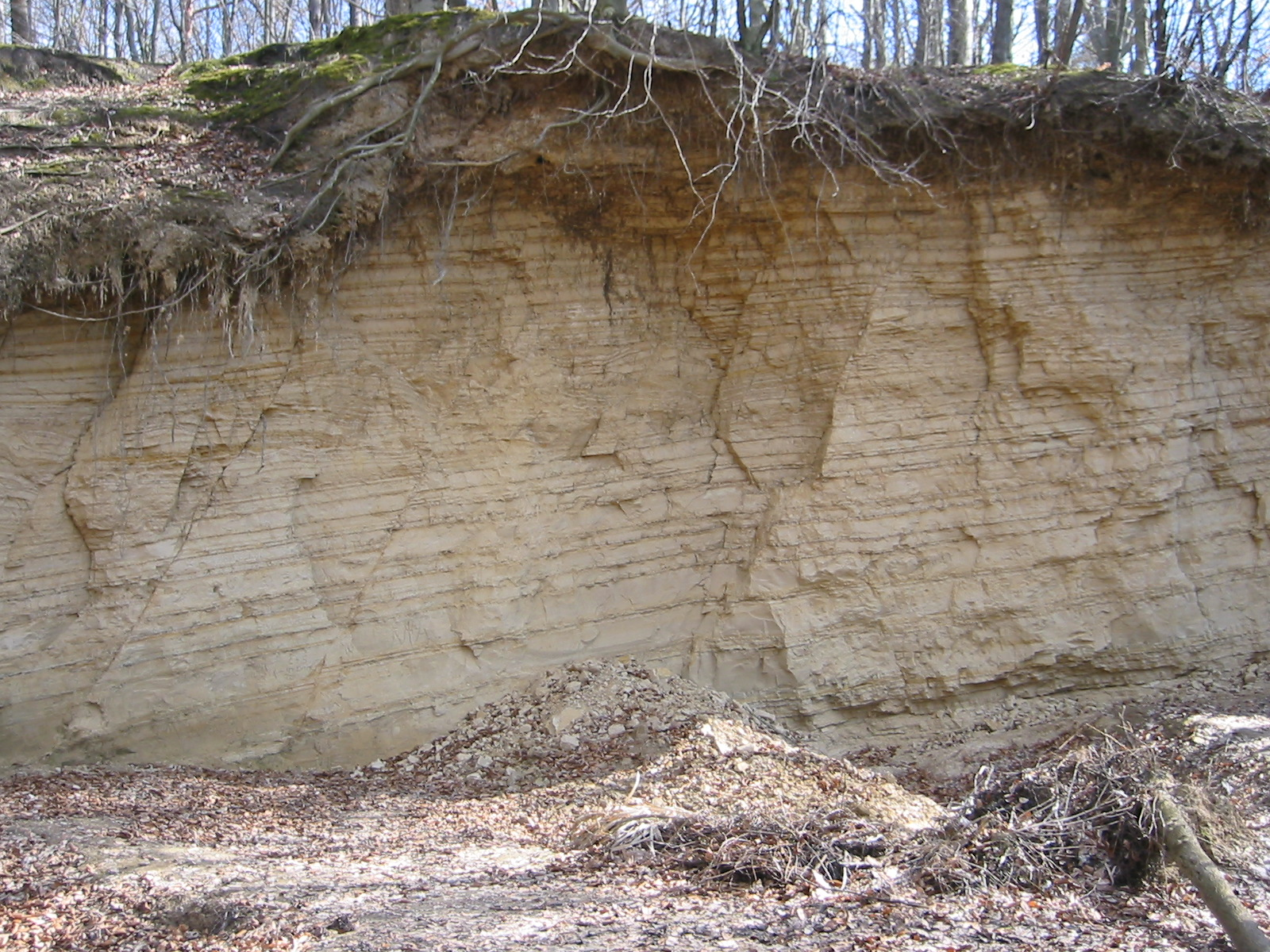
Varves formed during the Weichselian glaciation, near Eberswalde, Germany

Varves form in a variety of marine and lacustrine depositional environments from seasonal variation in clastic, biological, and chemical sedimentary processes.

The classic varve archetype is a light / dark coloured couplet deposited in a lake basin. During summer months, light laminae (thin layers) composed of silica and calcium carbonate are deposited. This is the consequence of dead phytoplankton, and other micro-organisms that create their skeletons or shells out of silica or calcium carbonate, falling to the lake bottom. This process of the precipitation and deposition of dead micro-organisms out of the water column is restricted to warm months when productivity (ecology) is high. The corresponding dark colored layers are composed of organic matter and fine sediment particles transported and deposited during spring freshets as a result of winter snowmelt. The alternation of these two distinct layers allows for high-precision dating of sediment profiles, for each couplet is equivalent to one year.

In addition to seasonal variation of sedimentary processes and deposition, varve formation requires the absence of bioturbation. Consequently, varves commonly form under anoxic conditions.

A well-known marine example of varved sediments are those found in the Santa Barbara basin, off California. Another long record of varved sediments is the palaeo-lacustrine record of the Piànico–Sèllere Basin (southern Alps). Here, the detrital layer part of each varve was used as a proxy for 771 palaeofloods which occurred over a period of 9.3 thousand years during an interglacial period in the Pleistocene.

== See also ==
- Dendrochronology – Method of dating based on the analysis of patterns of tree rings
- Dendroclimatology – Science of determining past climates from trees
- Rhythmite – Layers of sediment or sedimentary rock laid down with periodicity and regularity
