= Skredkommissionen =

Skredkommissionen (Swedish for "landslide commission") was a commission established in 1988 to research, develop and provide information about landslides in Swedish. It was disbanded in 1996. It was part of Ingenjörsvetenskapsakademien. Curt Fredén was a member.
