= Lundquist =

Lundquist is a Swedish surname. Notable people with the surname include:

- Adam Lundquist, American DJ
- Bo Lundquist (born 1942), Swedish businessman
- Bryan Lundquist (born 1985), American swimmer
- Carl Lundquist (1891–1916), Swedish cyclist
- Christoffer Lundquist (born 1970), Swedish musician and producer
- Constans Lundquist (1891–1950), Swedish diplomat
- David Lundquist (born 1973), American baseball player
- Erik Lundquist (1896–1961), Swedish sport shooter
- Evert Lundquist (1904–1994), Swedish footballer
- Ingemar Lundquist (1921–2007), Swedish-American engineer and inventor
- Kurt Lundquist (1925–2011), Swedish sprinter
- Lisbet Lundquist (born 1943), Danish film actress
- Lynn Lundquist (1934–2013), American politician and businessman
- Marianne Lundquist (1931–2020), Swedish swimmer
- Marie Lundquist (born 1950), Swedish author, cultural journalist and translator
- Oliver Lincoln Lundquist (1916–2008), American architect
- Sadie Lundquist (born 1998), American ice hockey executive
- Sille Lundquist (1970–2018), Danish fashion model and author
- Steve Lundquist (born 1961), American swimmer
- Sven Lundquist (1920–2007), Swedish sport shooter
- Verne Lundquist (born 1940), American sports announcer
- Vic Lundquist (1908–1938), Canadian hockey player

== See also ==
- Lundquist number
- Charles H. Lundquist College of Business, University of Oregon
- Lundqvist
