= Axel Erdmann =

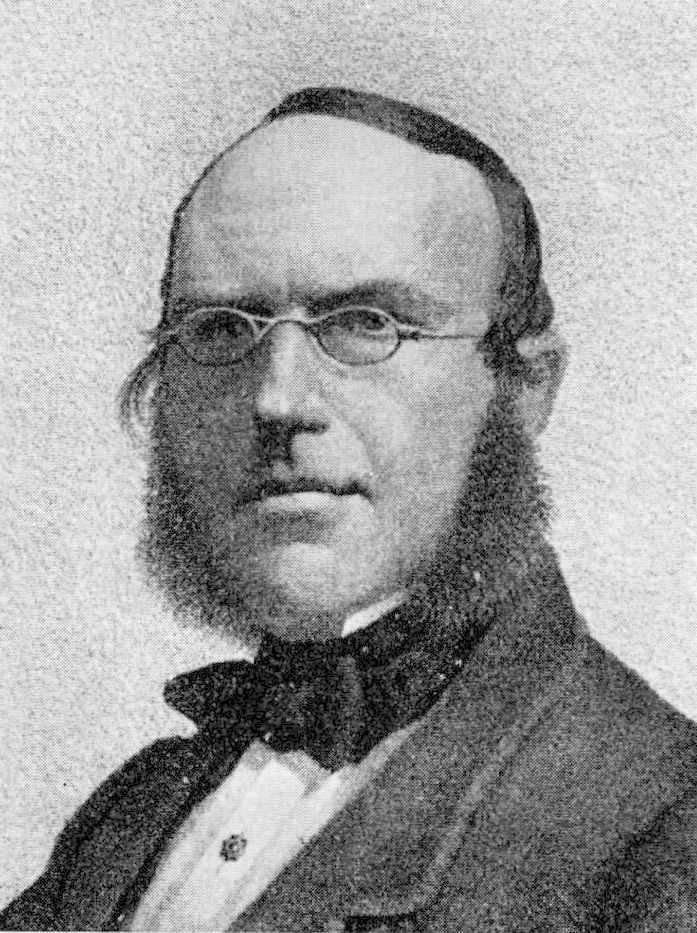
Erdmann

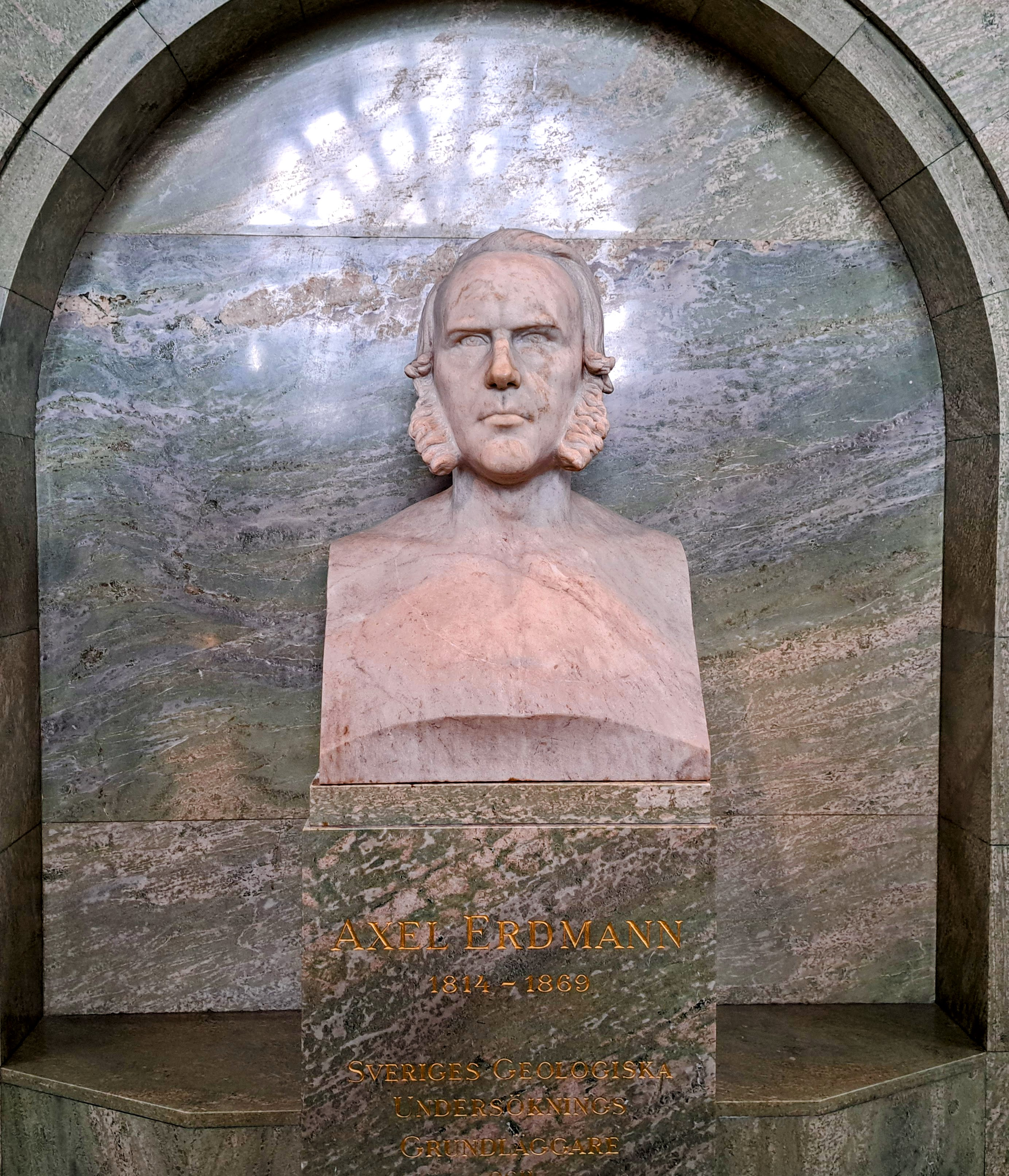
Bust of Erdmann at the Swedish Museum of Natural History in Stockholm

Axel Joachim Erdmann (August 12, 1814 – December 1, 1869) was a Swedish geologist, mineralogist and chemist. He was the father of the geologist Edvard Erdmann and the linguist Axel Erdmann.

Erdmann was a member of the Swedish Royal Academy of Sciences from 1846, becoming preses (chairman) in 1868.

In 1850 Erdmann became a teacher at Bergsskolan (School of mining and mountain engineering) in Falun, and in 1852 also a teacher at Högre artilleriläroverket (The Higher Artillery School, which also was an educational institute for officers in technical service as well as both military and civil engineers) in Marieberg, Stockholm. Erdmann was given the title of professor in 1854.

In 1858, Erdmann founded the Geological Survey of Sweden and remained the general director until 1869.
