= Mine surveying =

Mine surveying is the practice of determining the relative positions of points on or beneath the surface of the earth by direct or indirect measurements of distance, direction & elevation.

== International and National Institutions ==
- International Society for Mine Surveying (ISM)
- Australian Institute of Mine Surveyiors (AIMS)
- Czech Society of Mine Surveyors and Geologists (SDMG)
- German Mine Surveying Association (DMV e.V)
- Polish Mine Surveying Committee (PK-ISM)
- Institute of Mine Surveyors of South Africa (IMSSA)

== See also ==
- Surveying
- Land subsidence
- geological survey
- spatial sciences
