= Carl-Olof Morfeldt =

Swedish geologist and businessman

- Born: 19 May 1919; Hedemora, Dalarna
- Died: 21 December 2003 (aged 84)
- Citizenship: Sweden
- Education: Stockholm University
- Awards: Geologist of the Year (1999)
- Scientific career
- Fields: Geotechnical engineering Hydrogeology; Tunnel construction
- Workplaces: Skånska Cement AB; Royal Institute of Technology; Hagconsult AB

Carl-Olof Morfeldt (1919–2003) was a Swedish geologist and businessman. He was a founder and CEO of Hagconsult AB, an enterprise dedicated to geotechnical consultancy. In 1964, he became also its majority shareholder. Morfeldt was the foremost authority on geotechnical studies for building in Sweden. An expert on building tunnels and rooms in bedrock, Morfeldt was awarded an honorary doctorate from Chalmers University of Technology in 1979. In 1999, he was awarded the prize Geologist of the Year (Swedish: Årets geolog) by Naturvetarna.
