= Ernst Antevs =

Swedish-American geologist and educator

- Born: 20 November 1888; Vartofta, Sweden
- Died: May 19, 1974 (aged 85)
- Citizenship: Sweden, United States
- Education: Stockholm University
- Known for: Varve geochronology
- Scientific career
- Fields: Quaternary geology
- Doctoral advisor: Gerard De Geer

Ernst Valdemar Antevs (November 20, 1888 – May 19, 1974) was a Swedish-American geologist and educator who made significant contributions to Quaternary geology, particularly geomorphology and geochronology.

Ernst Valdemar Antevs was born on a farm in the Vartofta-Åsaka parish of Skaraborg, (now Västra Götaland), Sweden. He attended Stockholm University where in 1917, he was awarded his Ph.D. in geology. He was employed as a docent at the University of Stockholm from 1917 to 1935. He was also a research associate for the American Geographical Society (1921 to 1922), the Carnegie Institution of Washington (between 1922 and 1940), Geological Survey of Canada (between 1923 and 1930), and Harvard University (1924–1926). He moved to the United States during the 1930s and joined investigators from the Gila Pueblo Archaeological Foundation in Globe, Arizona. In 1939, he became a citizen of the United States. Antevs joined the University of Arizona Department Geochronology in 1957.

Antevs is best known for his contributions to North American quaternary geology as well as his scientific debate with Gerard De Geer, who was his former doctoral advisor. He was also involved in archaeological investigations at Clovis and Gila Pueblo. During May 1965, the University of Arizona conferred an honorary Doctor of Science degree on Ernst Antevs.

== Selected works ==
- Sayles, E.B., and Ernst Antevs (1941) The Chochise Culture (Medallian Papers: Gila Pueblo, Globe, Arizona)
