= Saudi Geological Survey =

Saudi Arabian department

Agency overview
- Formed: 1999
- Jurisdiction: Saudi Arabia
- Headquarters: Jeddah, Saudi Arabia
- Agency executives: Abdullah Al-Shamrani; CEO
- Website: sgs.gov.sa/en

The Saudi Geological Survey (SGS; Arabic: هيئة المساحة الجيولوجية السعودية) is the national geological survey of the Kingdom of Saudi Arabia.

== History and profile ==
The SGS was established as an independent entity attached to the ministry of petroleum and mineral resources following a council of ministers decision in 1999. It is built from other governmental agencies, including the former directorate general for mineral resources, the US Geological Survey (USGS) mission (1963–1999) and the Bureau de Recherches Géologiques et Minières (BRGM) mission (1972–1999).

== Activities ==
The Saudi Geological Survey carries out applied earth science work for government agencies, researchers, and the private sector. Its work includes geological mapping, mineral-resource studies, hydrogeology, environmental geology, engineering geology, and the assessment of geological hazards. The survey also produces technical reports, geological maps, mineral-resource information, and other geoscientific data relating to Saudi Arabia.

A major part of the survey's work is the collection and publication of national geological information. The Saudi Geological Survey is associated with the National Geological Database, a web portal that provides access to geological and topographic maps, mineral occurrence records, geochemistry and geophysics datasets, borehole information, surface-sample data, and related datasets for the Kingdom. These datasets are used by government bodies, researchers, and investors for geological research, resource assessment, planning, and exploration.

The survey also studies natural hazards that may affect populated areas, infrastructure, and development projects. Its work in this field includes the monitoring and assessment of earthquakes, volcanic activity, landslides, and other geohazards. In cooperation with the United States Geological Survey, the Saudi Geological Survey participated in a multi-year investigation of the northern Harrat Rahat volcanic field near Medina. The project examined the volcanic field through detailed geological mapping, geochronology, geochemistry, geophysical surveys, and seismic-hazard analysis.

The main areas of work include geological mapping, mineral exploration support, mining-development studies, hydrogeology, environmental geology, engineering geology, geohazard assessment, and the management of geological data.

=== Expeditions ===
On 25 February 2006, the Saudi Geological Survey organized a scientific excursion to begin to explore the Empty Quarter. The expedition consisted of 89 environmentalists, geologists, and scientists from Saudi Arabia and abroad. They discovered meteorites and various kinds of fossilized organisms in the desert. The expedition discovered 31 new plant species and plant varieties, as well as 24 species of birds that inhabit the region, which fascinated scientists as to how they have survived under the harsh conditions of the Empty Quarter.

== See also ==
- United States Geological Survey
- British Geological Survey
