= Naturvetarna =

Swedish trade union

- Founded: 2009
- Location: Sweden
- Members: 32,000 (2012)
- Key people: Ivar de la Cruz
- Affiliations: SACO
- Website: www.naturvetarna.se

Naturvetarna is a federation of Swedish trade unions representing professionals working in natural science or related areas. The federation was established in 2009 by the merger of Naturvetareförbundet and Agrifack.

The federation has sections representing:

- Agronomists (Agronomförbundet)
- Biomedical analysts (Biomedicinska analytikerföreningen)
- Forest scientists (Delförbundet Skogsakademikerna)
- Dietists (Dietisternas riksförbund)
- Animal welfare inspectors (Djurskyddsinspektörernas riksförbund)
- Ecological engineers (Ekoingenjörernas riksförbund)
- Earth scientists (Geosektionen)
- Environment and health workers (Miljö- och hälsoskyddssektionen, MoH)
- Agronomical science teachers (Naturbrukslärarförbundet)
- Nutritionists (Nutritionistföreningen)
- Working environment inspectors (Sektionen Sveriges Arbetsmiljöinspektörer, SSAI)
- Hospital physicists (Svenska sjukhusfysikerförbundet)
- Hospital geneticists (Sveriges sjukhusgenetiker, SSG)

== Årets geolog ==
Each year, the Earth scientists section awards the prize Årets geolog (Geologist of the Year) to outstanding geologists. The laureates are:

- 2022 – Erik Jonsson
- 2021 – Åke Johansson
- 2020 – Emma Rehnström
- 2019 – Gunnar Eriksson
- 2018 – Elisabeth Einarsson
- 2017 – Geologins Dag
- 2016 – Christer Åkerman
- 2015 – Ebbe Zachrisson
- 2014 – Daniel Conley
- 2013 – Michael Stephens
- 2012 – Otto Hermelin
- 2011 – Arne Sundberg
- 2010 – Vivi Vajda
- 2009 – Maurits Lindström
- 2008 – David Gee
- 2007 – Else Marie Friis
- 2006 – Svante Björck
- 2005 – Olle Selinius
- 2004 – Gert Knutsson
- 2003 – Alasdair Skelton
- 2002 – Curt Fredén
- 2001 – Stefan Claesson
- 2000 – Sven Laufeld
- 1999 – Carl-Olof Morfeldt
- 1998 – Jan Lundqvist and Thomas Lundqvist
- 1997 – Karin Eriksson and Lisbeth Godin-Jonasson
