= Pennsylvania Geological Survey =

The Pennsylvania Geological Survey, or the Bureau of Geologic Survey, operates under the Pennsylvania Department of Conservation and Natural Resources. The geological survey is over 180 years old and was established in 1836 by legislative mandate. There have been four total geologic surveys, with the fourth and current survey being established in 1919. Its main office is in Middletown, Pennsylvania, with an additional regional office in Pittsburgh. Survey geologists map the surface and subsurface geology of the state, and their findings are publicly available in their headquarters’ library, in an online list of bureau publications, or through the web-mapping application PaGEODE. The survey also licenses hundreds of drilling companies each year, and drillers can register through the Department of Conservation and Natural Resources website.

The current State Geologist and director of the Pennsylvania Geological Survey is Dr. Gale C. Blackmer, who leads administrative functions and the bureau’s three divisions. The Geologic and Geographic Information Systems Division concerns information technology, GIS, earth science education, and the bureau’s literature and rock sample libraries. The Geologic Mapping Division contributes stratigraphic studies and groundwater and environmental geology. Lastly, the Geologic Resources Division performs mineral resource analysis, geochemistry analysis, and interprets petroleum and subsurface geology.

== Mission and Purpose ==
The current, and fourth, geological survey, created in 1919 by the Pennsylvania General Assembly, was tasked with “‘undertak[ing], conduct[ing], and maintain[ing] the organization of a thorough and extended survey of the State, for the purpose of elucidating the geology and topography of the State’”. The Pennsylvania Geological Survey’s mission is to serve the Commonwealth of Pennsylvania as a “science-based research organization that collects, preserves, and uses data in support of objective interpretations about Pennsylvania’s geologic resources,” which include water energy, minerals, and land.

At its founding, the survey was given the responsibility to “‘put the results of the survey, with the results of the previous surveys, into form convenient for reference.’” Due to this, an overarching goal of the survey is to “[disseminate] impartial geologic information essential to environmental stewardship, human health and safety, infrastructure development, and economic growth”. This dissemination occurs through providing openly available geologic maps, publications, reports, databases, educational outreach, and other resources to both the public and private sectors.

== History ==
The Pennsylvania Geological Survey, one of the “few Executive Branch agencies whose history can be traced to the first half of the 19th century”, has been documenting Pennsylvania geology since 1836. Over time, Pennsylvania’s state interests have evolved from being focused primarily on coal and petroleum to combining those concerns with water supply, landslides, sinkholes, and tourism.

=== The First Geological Survey (1836-1858) ===
The First Geological Survey of Pennsylvania, created in 1836, was the first of four surveys in the state. In the 1830s, the population of Pennsylvania was increasing, industry was expanding, and anthracite coal was proving useful in the manufacture of iron. February 1832 saw the formation of the Geological Society of Pennsylvania, which sent persistent requests to the state legislature in December 1832 and December 1834 to urge a topographic, geologic, and mineralogic survey of Pennsylvania. In 1835, a committee of the Pennsylvania House of Representatives, chaired by Rep. Charles B. Trego, read a report of the need to conduct a survey and thus reported a bill for consideration by the legislature. The bill, named Act 73 of 1836, was signed by Governor Ritner on March 29, 1836. Act 73 of 1836 established

“‘a geological and mineralogical survey of the state with a view to determine the order, succession, arrangement, relative position... of the several strata or geological formations within the state, and to discover and examine all beds and deposits or ores, coals, clays, marls... as may be necessary to make a full and complete geological and mineralogical survey of the state’”.

Pennsylvania was the ninth state in the United States to enact legislation for a geological survey. The First Geological Survey put an emphasis on internal improvements and had a desire to discover usable mineral resources in an industrializing era.

The First Geological Survey began fieldwork in May 1836, and held annual field campaigns until the summer of 1842, when operations were paused because of a lack of fund appropriations. The survey began again in 1851, and a report of its findings was published in 1858.

The first State Geologist was Henry Darwin Rogers, who was previously a professor at the University of Pennsylvania. Rogers and his assistants made a rapid trip across the state in the direction of Erie to divide Pennsylvania into three sections and worked on the “Appalachian Section” that summer. The survey’s work here proved that the mountains of central Pennsylvania were not underlain by rocks of the same age and that the exploration for coal in the mountains was useless, as coal did not exist in that area. Overall, the first survey’s efforts provided a profound new scientific understanding of Pennsylvania geology. From 1838 to 1840, a maximum of nine assistants were employed each year, and the greatest attention was paid to bituminous coal and metallic ore-rich areas. After a period of lapse due a lack of funding, additional fieldwork was conducted in 1851 and 1852, largely in anthracite fields.

Citizens of Pennsylvania clamored for the publication of Rogers’s report and maps in 1851, but his work was not published until 1858. This final report was printed in two quarto volumes of 1631 pages, including 778 engraved woodcuts inserted into the text pages, 23 engraved plates showing illustrations of fossil plants, and other engraved plates of geologic sections and sketches of scenery. In addition to this, there were three full-color lithographs included in the report. This work set the framework and standard for all subsequent geologic mapping in the states along the Appalachian Mountains, and the first survey’s discoveries also prompted a new branch of geology: structural geology.

=== The Second Geological Survey (1874-1889) ===
Pennsylvania’s industrial growth and the discovery of oil in the state prompted public demand for additional complete and detailed geologic information about coal, petroleum, iron ore, and other resources. More specifically, the interests of the mineral industries, the discovery of petroleum in northwestern Pennsylvania, and the need for accurate geologic maps resulted in the creation of the Second Geologic Survey in 1874. Established May 14, 1874, by the state legislature, the second survey included a ten-man oversight committee called the Board of Commissioners, that was authorized to choose a State Geologist and approve their plans. This board then selected J. Peter Lesley as State Geologist, who was also a former professor at the University of Pennsylvania.

Lesley was a pioneer in utilizing topographic and structure contouring and aneroid altimeters in geologic mapping, and he was also a respected authors of many reports, articles, and other publications. The Board of Commissioners gave Lesley freedom in planning and executing the work of the second survey. In 1876, Lesley stated that

“‘the first survey was essentially a reconnaissance... The second survey is intended to supply this lack; to take up their work where they left off; to reduce their general statements to precision; to measure, where they could only estimate; to define, what they could only indicate; to demonstrate what they could see to be true, but which they could not prove and show in all its truth’”.

To accomplish his goals, Lesley built up a team of trained workers and demanded the highest standards of accuracy and detail from them. Lesley also purposely used methods that were at odds with Rogers, as he believed Rogers did not recognize his assistants enough. These methods included not amassing reports to be published later but instead publishing reports as soon as they could be edited and assembled. This allowed survey results to be timelier and more useful. Additionally, Lesley made sure his assistants received proper credit for their work.

The contributions and successes of the Second Geological Survey include almost 120 atlases and volumes, comprising numerous maps, drawing, columnar sections, and cross sections, and over 25,000 pages of printed material. The second survey also produced a “Grand Atlas” in six parts and a full geologic map of Pennsylvania. In addition to this, the second survey established the rock stratigraphy of the state and much of the stratigraphic nomenclature still used today. It published geologic maps for all 67 Pennsylvania counties, performed correlation studies in the oil and coal regions of western Pennsylvania, provided unprecedented detail and precision in mapping the anthracite districts, and began the first large-scale, systematic use of structure contours in geologic mapping.

With all of these accomplishments, however, there were also frustrations with the second survey. The uncertainty of the renewal of its biennial appropriation of funds created issues with planning future activities and led to multiple staff resignations. The second survey was also criticized by the legislature for its publication costs, the number of volumes produced, and the amount of repetitive material. By the time it ended, the second survey spent almost two-thirds of its $1.6 million budget on publishing.

=== The Third Geological Survey (1899-1914) ===
Pennsylvania’s Third Geological Survey was established as the Topographic and Geologic Survey of Pennsylvania by legislative act on April 28, 1899. The act’s stipulations included a commission of three unpaid citizens to confer and accept cooperation with the United States Geological Survey (USGS) to create contour topographic and geologic maps of Pennsylvania. G. W. McNees, Simon Harrold, and Fred D. Barker were then appointed as commissioners. An enactment on May 13, 1909, then authorized the establishment and maintenance of a topographic and geologic survey of the state and the appointment of a State Geologist.

Richard R. Hice was named the State Geologist in 1909 and was a former brick manufacturer and founder of the American Ceramic Society. He directed the third survey’s efforts primarily towards coal, natural gas, and oil. In his words, “‘The primary purpose of a Geological Survey is the encouragement of the mineral production of the State’”. There was also a mutual partnership between the third survey and the USGS at this time, and work in the first cooperative year included mapping the Uniontown and Masontown quadrangles and the Gaines and Elkland quadrangles. Most of the geologic work was done in the western part of the state and oriented almost exclusively toward economic resources. Many reports were published by the USGS, with 17 volumes also being published by the third survey itself. An especially important report by the third survey concerns the Broad Top coal field.

The third survey is best known for its work in the topographic mapping of Pennsylvania. The third survey resulted from pressure on the legislature when enough legislators and citizens began to desire an accurate topographic map of the state, and also when people appreciated the economic value of a cooperative arrangement with the USGS. Topographic mapping was labor-intensive and took a large amount of artistic skill. The third survey was able to produce multiple topographic maps at a 1:62,500 scale with a contour interval of 20 feet. These maps portrayed accurately for the first time the topography and position of natural and cultural features in Pennsylvania.

Despite the importance of the third survey’s work, money was scarce. During the entire fifteen-year existence of the third survey, only about less than $250,000 was spent by the state on its operations. However, the third survey is still “best honored for the successful implementation of the cooperative Federal and State topographic mapping program which exists today for the benefit of the people of Pennsylvania”. There are no administrative or legislative records about the third survey after 1914. No publications or appropriations by the state legislature ensued after this year.

=== The Fourth Geological Survey (1919-present) ===
Pennsylvania’s Fourth Geological Survey was established June 7, 1919, as a bureau within the Department of Internal Affairs. Its objective is to perform continuing service to the Commonwealth and the geological community. It is empowered to “‘undertake, conduct, and maintain... a thorough and extended survey of the State for the purpose of elucidating the geology and topography of the State’”. Its legislative act outlined a large number of activities for the fourth survey including locating and analyzing all types of minerals, resources, and useful rock formations, maintaining collections of samples, the formation of a library, cooperating with state and federal organizations, and publishing its results.

==== George H. Ashley ====
George H. Ashley took office as the Pennsylvania State Geologist in 1919. Ashley had worked in the coal industry in Pennsylvania for two decades before this position and had been the State Geologist of Tennessee for two years. Ashley was also a previous Chief of the Coal Section in the USGS . The first map produced by the fourth survey was of Pennsylvania’s oil and gas fields. A coal miners’ strike at the time created incentive to search for alternative sources of coal. Ashley also focused on finding sources of limestone for roadbuilding. Foremost in Ashley’s plan was to create a new atlas of Pennsylvania, with both a topographic and geologic map of each quadrangle, which unfortunately did not occur within his tenure. He had nine geologists on his team during his time as State Geologist, with thirteen others being contracted to produce geologic maps.

The fourth survey’s publishing was frustrated at first by a slow state printing office, but by the end of its first decade, almost 100 bulletins were printed along with six atlases and twelve mineral resource maps. A single geologic map of the state was also published in 1931. A cooperative program with the USGS was initiated in 1923 to ascertain the groundwater resources of the state, which produced six regional reports and a statewide report over the next 18 years. Ashley retired on August 31, 1946, after a 27-year career as State Geologist. Under his direction, he fourth survey produced 11 atlases, 6 county reports, 19 general geology reports, 29 mineral resource reports, 7 groundwater reports, and 130 progress reports.

==== Stanley H. Cathcart ====
Stanley H. Cathcart took office as State Geologist on January 1, 1947, with Ralph W. Stone serving as interim State Geologist between Ashley and Cathcart. Cathcart's earliest experience, with the USGS, was with metalliferous geology, but he also had a strong background in oil through multiple overseas oil explorations. As oil drilling reached deeper, unexposed formations, interest in them across Pennsylvania increased. In 1950, Cathcart instituted a series of annual reports listing the data from recently drilled deep wells. He also began annual reporting on the production of minerals in Pennsylvania in 1950. Cathcart died in 1953, with Ralph W. Stone also serving as interim State Geologist after Cathcart's death.

==== Carlyle Gray ====
Carlyle Gray took office as acting State Geologist in October 1953 and formally took office in October 1955. Gray restarted the atlas mapping program after a yearslong halt due to war and the Great Depression. He also oversaw the shift in mapping scale to a 7 ½-minute series of topographic maps at 1:24,000 scale, which allowed for more detail and accuracy. Gray’s survey first mapped the carbonates of the Great Valley in Lebanon County, then moving on to two corridors in the Valley and Ridge province. Mapping also continued in the bituminous fields, centering on Clearfield County. Gray commenced an extensive study on the Cornwall Iron Mines along with studies on the geology of Bucks County, chromite mining, paleontology of the Bloomsburg Formation, and the glacial geology of northwestern Pennsylvania. Two new volumes were published, including Mineral Collecting in Pennsylvania and Fossil Collecting in Pennsylvania, both now discontinued due to overextraction, habitat destruction, and private property concerns at sites. The geologic staff of the fourth survey reconnaissance mapped the entirety of the state and compiled new data on 15-minute quadrangle maps. What resulted from this was the most detailed and colorful geologic map of Pennsylvania yet. Lastly, Gray restarted groundwater studies in the state. Gray resigned in September 1961, and Alan R. Geyer served as interim State Geologist.

==== Arthur A. Socolow ====
Arthur A. Socolow was named Pennsylvania State Geologist at the end of 1961. During his tenure, the fourth survey was transferred to the Office of Resource Management in the Department of Environmental Resources in 1971. Geologic mapping remained the cornerstone of survey activities, and the mapping of the Valley and Ridge province in central Pennsylvania focused on Williamsport and Altoona, with additional mapping done in the northern parts of the bituminous coal fields. In the late 1960s, mapping began in eastern Pennsylvania because of population growth, and mapping was also expanded into the northeast of the state as well. Socolow instituted a project to revise the 1960 geologic map of Pennsylvania and thus published a new map in 1980. The first correlation chart for the state was published in 1983. Mineral studies were also in the forefront of fourth survey activities, and the Environmental Geology division was created in 1968 to examine and anticipate the effects of man’s activities on the environment. This division produced the engineering properties of various Pennsylvania rocks and participated in water, landslide potential, sinkhole development, and environmental geology of metropolitan areas studies. Lastly, Socolow instituted three new publication series: Pennsylvania Geology, The Educational Series, and The Geologic Park Guides. Socolow retired in August 1986, leaving the fourth survey with a staff of 43 people.

==== 1987 to Present ====
Donald M. Hoskins served as interim State Geologist for five months and became State Geologist officially on January 8, 1987. Hoskins then served in this position until January 27, 2001. During his tenure as State Geologist, on July 1, 1995, the Governor of Pennsylvania signed a bill to reorganize the Department of Environmental Resources into two cabinet-level agencies: Conservation and Natural Resources and Environmental Protection. The Pennsylvania Geological Survey was thus put under the purview of the Department of Conservation and Natural Resources.

Jay B. Parrish served as State Geologist from 2001 until 2010, and George E. W. Love served as State Geologist from 2010 until 2015. Gale C. Blackmer was then named State Geologist and director of the fourth survey in 2015. Her specialties are structural geology and tectonics, but she has experience with many geological disciplines. The official internal name of the Pennsylvania Geological Survey was changed in 2019 from the Bureau of Topographic and Geologic Survey to its current Bureau of Geological Survey.

== Publications and Data ==
The Pennsylvania Geological Survey collects data on groundwater, economic resources, and geologic hazards:

- Groundwater
- Oil and gas
- Mineral Industries
- Sinkholes
- Earthquakes
- Landslides

The survey has published hundreds of reports and maps over its existence, many in cooperation with the USGS. The most popular group of datasets is the Bedrock Geology of Pennsylvania. It is a group of 1:250,000-scale ArcGIS shapefiles for Pennsylvania geologic units, geologic contacts, dikes, and faults. The Pennsylvania Geology Magazine is a free online publication that includes articles about Pennsylvania geology, earth science education, topographic mapping, and announcements of new publications and conferences.

Online publications are available as ZIP or PDF files. The Pennsylvania Geological Survey Publications ZIP file contains descriptions of each series, individual report information, and hyperlinks to all publications. Publications can also be selected and downloaded through geographical searches on PaGEODE. PaGEODE stands for Pennsylvania Geologic Data Exploration, and this database includes GIS datasets related to bedrock and surficial geology, mining resources, or geologic hazards. Almost all survey publications can be borrowed from either the survey library or through an interlibrary loan. Free publications, that are still in print, may be ordered from the survey via email. These include educational book series booklets, park guides, page-size maps, poster maps, and information circulars. GIS datasets are included with many of the geologic maps and reports released since 2000. Databases exist for water wells and springs, oil and gas wells, coalbed-methane wells, quarries, sinkholes, and earthquake epicenters. The Department of Conservation and Natural Resources website also includes a list from recent publications from the survey going back six months. Many of the geologic mapping products may also be obtained from the USGS and American Association of State Geologists-hosted National Geological Map Database (NGMDB).

Another database, the Exploration and Development Well Information Network, also called EDWIN, is managed by the Pennsylvania Geological Survey. This database provides access to the Pennsylvania’s over 180,000 oil and gas wells on record and includes both scanned oil and gas well documents from the Department of Environmental Protection and associated digital and interpreted data through a web-based application. EDWIN’s information consists of location, survey reports, completion reports, fracking fluid composition, plugging certificates, and well cards. Those interested may either subscribe to the online service or access the database for free at the survey’s physical locations.

The Pennsylvania Geological Survey also hosts a database of water wells, boreholes, and springs in the Pennsylvania Groundwater Information System (PaGWIS). This information can be found on PaGEODE and details about the history and data included is available.

The Pennsylvania Geological Survey’s library is located in Middletown, Pennsylvania and is open to the public. The library includes aerial photographs from 1946 to 1999. Agricultural and Stabilization Conservation Series photographs range from 1946-1981 and are in black and white at a 1:20,000 scale. USGS photographs range from the late 1960s to the 1970s, and are in black and white at 1:20,000 and 1:40,000 scales. National High-Altitude Photography photographs started in 1980, are mostly in black and white but have some color-infrared examples and are at a 1:80,000 scale. National Aerial Photography Program photographs are from 1987, 1992, and 1999. These photographs are mostly black and white with some color-infrared examples from 1987 and are at a 1:40,000 scale. Additionally, the library houses over 20,000 geological books and maps, and more than 90 geology journals. It also includes all Pennsylvania Geological Survey publications, all state-related reports and maps from the USGS and Federal Bureau of Mines, and some publications from other states and countries. Lastly, the library houses thousands of photographs taken by geologists and staff going back to the early 1900s and also many topographic maps of Pennsylvania with sizes ranging from 1:24,000 to 1:500,000.

== Partnerships ==
The Field Conference of Pennsylvania Geologists, or FCOPG, is an annual conference for “industry, government, academic, and student geologists working and studying in Pennsylvania”. It has been operating for over 90 years in different locations around the state. The FCOPG has found success in part because of the efforts of volunteers from the Pennsylvania Geological Survey and other organizations. The survey has hosted most of the previous conferences, and survey members have and currently serve as organizers and members of the conference’s team of officers.
