= Olov Lundqvist =

Swedish ice hockey player

- Born: November 23, 1988 (age 36) Fällfors, Sweden
- Height: 6 ft 0 in (183 cm)
- Weight: 187 lb (85 kg; 13 st 5 lb)
- Position: Defence
- Shot: Left
- Played for: Piteå HC; Asplöven HC; Borås HC; Luleå HF; Mora IK; Södertälje SK
- NHL draft: Undrafted
- Playing career: 2007–2018

Olov Lundqvist (born November 23, 1988) is a Swedish professional ice hockey defenceman who plays with Asplöven HC of the Swedish Allsvenskan.

On February 27, 2014, Lundqvist was loaned to Luleå HF of the Swedish Hockey League (SHL).

== Career statistics ==
			Regular season					Playoffs
Season	Team	League	GP	G	A	Pts	PIM	GP	G	A	Pts	PIM
2004–05	Skellefteå AIK J18	J18 Allsvenskan	14	2	1	3	33	—	—	—	—	—
2004–05	Skellefteå AIK J20	J20 SuperElit	1	0	0	0	0	—	—	—	—	—
2005–06	Skellefteå AIK J18	J18 Allsvenskan	12	1	2	3	14	—	—	—	—	—
2005–06	Skellefteå AIK J20	J20 SuperElit	8	0	0	0	4	—	—	—	—	—
2006–07	Skellefteå AIK J20	J20 SuperElit	40	4	6	10	70	2	0	0	0	2
2007–08	Skellefteå AIK J20	J20 SuperElit	39	2	11	13	46	2	0	0	0	2
2007–08	Piteå HC	Division 1	1	0	0	0	0	—	—	—	—	—
2008–09	Piteå HC	Division 1	34	12	24	36	20	—	—	—	—	—
2009–10	Asplöven HC	Division 1	35	7	34	41	36	—	—	—	—	—
2010–11	Asplöven HC	Division 1	37	4	32	36	36	10	2	5	7	8
2011–12	Borås HC	HockeyAllsvenskan	52	4	14	18	34	—	—	—	—	—
2012–13	Asplöven HC	HockeyAllsvenskan	51	7	12	19	46	—	—	—	—	—
2013–14	Asplöven HC	HockeyAllsvenskan	50	7	13	20	28	—	—	—	—	—
2013–14	Luleå HF	SHL	1	0	0	0	0	2	0	0	0	0
2014–15	Asplöven HC	HockeyAllsvenskan	47	2	8	10	32	—	—	—	—	—
2015–16	Mora IK	HockeyAllsvenskan	36	2	4	6	16	—	—	—	—	—
2015–16	Södertälje SK	Hockeyettan	6	0	4	4	4	18	1	5	6	4
2016–17	Södertälje SK J20	J20 SuperElit	2	1	0	1	2	—	—	—	—	—
2016–17	Södertälje SK	HockeyAllsvenskan	33	0	3	3	16	—	—	—	—	—
2017–18	Asplöven HC	Hockeyettan	18	2	9	11	10	—	—	—	—	—
2017–18	Piteå HC	Hockeyettan	18	1	4	5	8	10	1	0	1	4
SHL totals			1	0	0	0	0	2	0	0	0	0
HockeyAllsvenskan totals			269	22	54	76	172	—	—	—	—	—
Hockeyettan (Division 1) totals			149	26	107	133	114	38	3	10	13	12
