= Alberta Geological Survey =

Provincial geological survey of Alberta, Canada

Agency overview
- Formed: 1921
- Headquarters: Edmonton, Alberta
- Agency executives: Andrew Beaton, Vice President; Matt Grobe, Provincial Geologist
- Parent agency: Alberta Energy Regulator
- Website: ags.aer.ca

The Alberta Geological Survey (AGS), founded in 1921, is the official provincial geological survey of Alberta, Canada and currently operates as a division within the Alberta Energy Regulator. The AGS provides geological information and advice about the geology of Alberta to the Government of Alberta, the Alberta Energy Regulator (AER), industry, and the public to support the exploration, sustainable development, regulation, and conservation of Alberta's resources.

The AGS is the official provincial geological survey of Alberta. It operates under the guiding principles of the Canada Intergovernmental Geoscience Accord, which identifies the provincial survey as being the principal steward, resident authority, and principal investigator for public geoscience. AGS is responsible for describing the geology and resources in the province and provides information and knowledge to help resolve land use, environmental, public health, and safety issues related to geosciences.

== History ==
Geological surveys exist at the provincial/territorial and federal levels of government in Canada. The complementary roles and responsibilities of provincial geological surveys and the federal survey, the Geological Survey of Canada (GSC), are defined in the Intergovernmental Geoscience Accord, which was signed by Ken Hughes, Alberta Minister of Energy, at Canada's Annual Energy and Mines Ministers' Conference in September, 2012.

The roots of AGS go back to 1912, one year after the founding of the University of Alberta. Dr. Henry Marshall Tory, then president of the university, appointed Dr. John Allan to initiate the teaching of geology and establish a new Geology Department at the U of A. Dr. Allan took up the challenge and stayed on as Professor of Geology for nearly 40 years, with 37 of those years as head of the Geology Department.

In 1920, Dr. Allan delivered to the Legislative Assembly of Alberta the first government report on the mineral resources of the province. Dr. Allan reported on 18 different mineral resources known to occur in the province at that time. That report marks the beginning of AGS. The Alberta Geological Survey was created in 1921, by Order in Council of the Alberta government, as a core part of the Scientific and Industrial Research Council, later the Alberta Research Council (ARC). In the late 1990s, AGS was transferred to the Alberta Energy and Utilities Board (a predecessor to the AER) to provide geoscience expertise to support the regulatory process, to provide necessary geoscience information and knowledge to the Government of Alberta, and to fulfill the need for unbiased, credible public geoscience information. AGS resides within the provincial regulator to this day, providing geoscience support for Alberta's regulatory process.

The manager of the AGS represents Alberta on the National Geological Surveys Committee, which governs the implementation of the Intergovernmental Geoscience Accord and fosters cross-jurisdictional survey co-operation in Canada.

== Mission ==
The specific mission of the AGS is to provide data, information, knowledge and advice about the geology of Alberta needed by government, industry and the public for earth-resource stewardship and sustainable development in Alberta. Geological processes, like sedimentation, glaciation, mountain building and landslides, have shaped Alberta and provided Albertans with a wealth of Earth resources. Mapping and documenting these processes are key to understanding Alberta's current and untapped resources.
