= Ulf Erik Hagberg =

Swedish archaeologist and museum director

Ulf Erik Hagberg (1932–2012) was a Swedish archaeologist and museum director. Hagberg studied at Uppsala University, and worked for some years within the Swedish National Heritage Board in Stockholm and on Öland, where he headed the excavation at Skedemosse that resulted in the find of several spectacular gold objects. He received his Ph.D. in Uppsala in 1968 and served as docent and lecturer at the university until 1977, when he was appointed director of the County Museum in Skara. From 1988 until his retirement in 1997, he was the director of the Swedish Museum of National Antiquities; there he created the "gold room", where, among other things, the gold findings from Skedemosse are displayed. After his retirement, he served for a few years as the Secretary of the Royal Academy of Letters, History and Antiquities.
