= Delaware Geological Survey =

Delaware state agency that conducts geologic and hydrologic research

- Abbreviation: DGS
- Formation: 1951
- Type: Research & Education
- Location: Newark, Delaware
- Coordinates: 39.67853°N 75.74878°W
- Region served: US State of Delaware
- Director: Peter P. McLaughlin Jr.
- Website: http://www.dgs.udel.edu

The Delaware Geological Survey (DGS) is a scientific agency for the State of Delaware, located at the University of Delaware (UD) which conducts geologic and hydrologic research, service, and exploration. The mission of the DGS is to provide objective earth science information, advice, and service to citizens, policymakers, industries, and educational institutions of Delaware. The DGS became formally affiliated with the university's College of Earth, Ocean, and Environment (CEOE) in July 2008. Most DGS scientists have secondary faculty appointments in the College's Department of Geological Sciences.

The DGS is one of the 50 state geological surveys in the United States. By statute, the DGS is the state agency responsible for entering into agreements with its counterpart federal agencies, including the U.S. Geological Survey (USGS), the USGS Office of Minerals Information (formerly the U.S. Bureau of Mines), and the Bureau of Ocean Energy Management, Regulation and Enforcement (formerly the U.S. Minerals Management Service), and for administering all cooperative programs of the state with these agencies.

== Establishment ==
A geologic survey of Delaware was originally authorized in 1837 for a period of four years under the direction of James C. Booth, State Geologist. A permanent state geological survey was established by the Delaware General Assembly in 1951 and is funded by direct state appropriation. The 1951 statute founding the Survey contains its fundamental charges: study the geology of Delaware, investigate mineral and water resources, advise state government, and provide the results of its studies to the citizens and agencies of Delaware through publication and consultation. Additional responsibilities have been assigned over the years as the varied applications of the Survey’s basic mission were recognized: notable among these are spatial data coordination, direct support for emergency planning, response, and recovery, and involvement in water-supply planning.

== Past directors ==
The director of the DGS also serves as the official State Geologist and is a member of the Association of American State Geologists. The Director also has a secondary appointment with the UD Dept of Geological Sciences. Past Directors include:

- James C. Booth, 1837–1841
- Johan J. Groot, 1951–1969
- Robert R. Jordan, 1969–2003
- John H. Talley, 2003–2011
- Peter P. McLaughlin Jr., 2011–2011 (Interim)
- David R. Wunsch, 2011–2025
- Peter P. McLaughlin Jr., 2025 - Present

== Research topics ==
DGS research and service activities are focused on surficial and subsurface geology, hydrology/hydrogeology, natural hazards, topographic mapping, and information dissemination. These efforts impact a wide variety of issues ranging from water resources, agriculture, environmental protection, and energy and mineral resources to economic development, land-use planning, emergency management, public health, and recreation.

Active project topics include:

- STATEMAP (surficial geologic formation identification and mapping)
- Sub-surface geologic formation identification and mapping
- Aquifer extent / depth and water availability
- Water supply (surface water in streams, groundwater, reservoirs)
- Coastal processes (tidal floods, marsh inundation, beach erosion)
- Groundwater monitoring and water quality
- Groundwater modelling
- Natural hazards, such as floods, droughts, earthquakes, sinkholes
- Topographic mapping
- Wastewater and rapid infiltration basin systems (RIBS)
- State geospatial / GIS infrastructure and coordination

== Data and publications ==
The DGS has published over 210 publications through its publication series. Publications represent the results of original professional research and, as such, are used by professionals and the public. All of the publications are free to read and download as PDF files. Many of the recent publications are accompanied by digital datasets, usually in spreadsheets or GIS datasets. Most of these data are also available as Web Mapping Services.

== Partners ==
- Delaware Department of Natural Resources and Environmental Control
- United States Geological Survey
