= Thomas Lundqvist (geologist) =

Swedish geologist (born 1932)

- Born: 1932 (age 93–94)
- Awards: Årets geolog (1998)
- Scientific career
- Fields: Geology
- Workplaces: Geological Survey of Sweden; University of Gothenburg

Thomas Lundqvist (born 1932) is a Swedish geologist. He is son of Gösta Lundqvist and brother of Jan Lundqvist, both of whom are geologists. Thomas Lundqvist worked at Geological Survey of Sweden from 1962 onwards and was professor at the University of Gothenburg from 1986 to 1989. In 1968 he obtained a Ph.D. degree in geology at Stockholm University with the thesis Precambrian Geology of the Los-Hamra Region, Central Sweden.

Since 1996 Thomas Lundqvist has been member of the Finnish Society of Sciences and Letters.
