= Geological Survey of Finland =

Finnish research project

Coordinates: 60.1802°N 24.8301°E

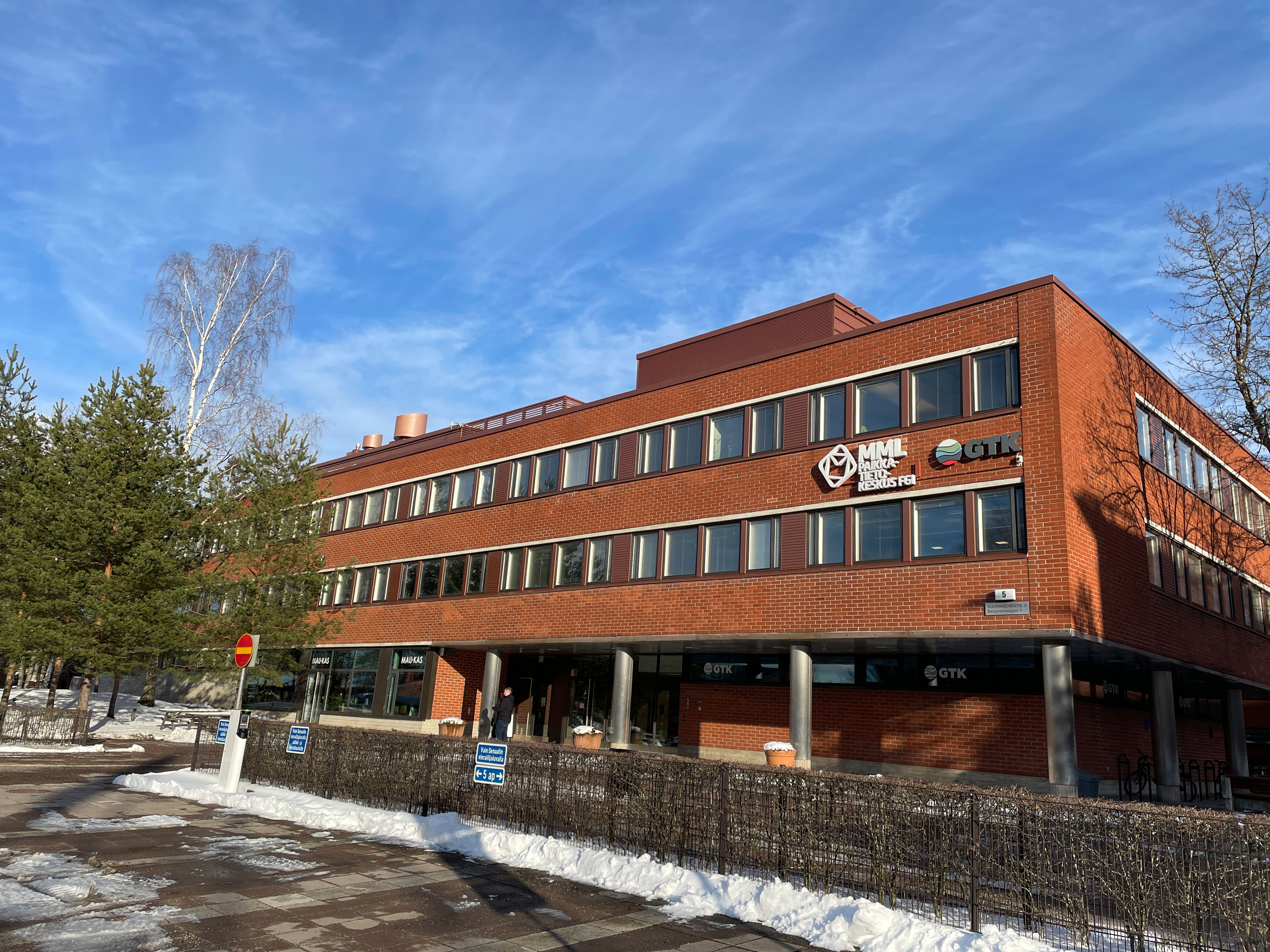
Photo: GTK's office in Otaniemi, Espoo. Founded 1885 Location Espoo, Kokkola, Loppi, Kuopio, Rovaniemi, Outokumpu Director General Kimmo Tiilikainen

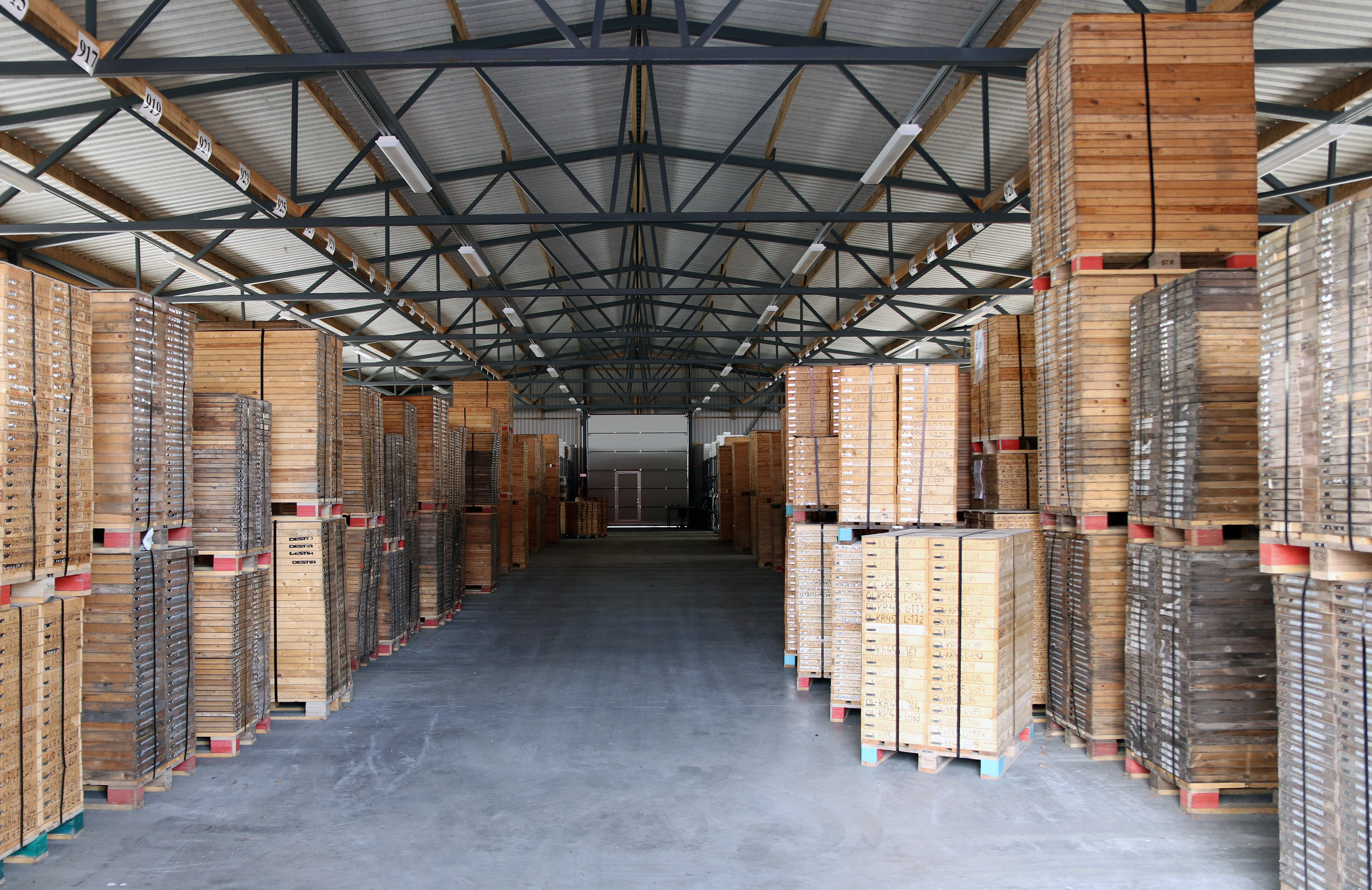
A drill core archive in Loppi.

The Geological Survey of Finland (Finnish: Geologian tutkimuskeskus abbreviated GTK, Swedish: Geologiska forskningscentralen) is the geological survey of Finland. The organization was founded in 1885 when Emperor Alexander III decreed that the Geological Survey of Finland (Suomen geologinen tutkimus) be established. GTK is a research institution governed by the Finnish Ministry of Employment and the Economy, operating in Finland and globally.

== Publications ==
The Geological Survey of Finland publishes the Geological Survey of Finland, Bulletin since 1895. Before 1971 this publication was named Bulletin de la Commission géologique de Finlande. From 1929 to 1968 the Bulletin de la Commission géologique de Finlande appeared in a double edition together with the publication Comptes Rendus de la Société Géologique de Finlande of The Geological Society of Finland. The survey publishes also "special papers" and "reports of investigation".

== Directors ==
- Kimmo Tiilikainen 2021-
- Mika Nykänen, 2014-2021
- Elias Ekdahl, 2004-2014
- Raimo Matikainen 1997-2003
- Veikko Lappalainen 1992-1997
- Kalevi Kauranne 1980-1991
- Herman Stigzelius 1970–1980
- Vladi Marmo 1960–1969
- Aarne Laitakari 1935–1960
- Jakob Johannes Sederholm, 1893-1933
- K. A. Moberg 1886-1893

== Offices ==
The agency has 6 offices in the cities listed below:

- Kuopio
- Rovaniemi
- Otaniemi, Espoo
- Kokkola
- Outokumpu
- Loppi
