= Indiana Geological and Water Survey =

State agency in Indiana, United States

- Abbreviation: IGWS
- Formation: 1837
- Type: Research & Education
- Location: Bloomington, Indiana
- Region served: Indiana
- Website: igws.indiana.edu

Created in 1837, the Indiana Geological and Water Survey (IGWS) is an official agency of the U.S. state of Indiana charged with geological research and the dissemination of information about the state's energy, mineral and water resources. In 2017, the Indiana Geological Survey was renamed to the Indiana Geological and Water Survey. It is organized as a research institute of Indiana University Bloomington and located on campus.
