= Geological Survey of Slovenia =

Geological Survey of Slovenia, Slovenia
- Geološki zavod Slovenije (GeoZS)

Geological organisation overview
- Formed: May 7, 1946
- Headquarters: Dimičeva ulica 14, Ljubljana; 46.071046°N 14.514547°E
- Website: www.geo-zs.si

The Geological Survey of Slovenia (Slovene: Geološki zavod Slovenije, abbreviated GeoZS) is the primary geological research institute of Slovenia. It was founded on May 7, 1946.

== History ==
While Slovenia was part of Austro-Hungary, geological studies were carried out by the Imperial Geological Office (K. K. Geologischen Reichsanstalt), which is now the Federal Geological Office (Geologische Bundesanstalt) of Austria.
