= Geological Survey of Queensland =

Government agency in Queensland, Australia

The Geological Survey of Queensland (GSQ) is the Australian state of Queensland's government body responsible for the management of geoscience knowledge. It is a unit within the Government of Queensland's Department of Natural Resources and Mines, Manufacturing and Regional and Rural Development.

GSQ collects geoscience data either from industry – mining companies compels by legislation to report certain activities – or directly through its own surveys and then shares that information, sometimes after embargo periods, to enable potential investors a better understanding of the resource potential of Queensland.

The GSQ works closely with Australia's equivalent national government agency, Geoscience Australia, to ensure that data collected/generated by either agency is interoperable since resource potential may cross state borders.

GSQ is also involved with international efforts to standardise the reporting and representation of geoscience information, particularly through Semantic Web-based initiatives such as the ESIP Federation's Semantic Web for Earth and Environmental Terminology (SWEET) Ontologies project which operates an integrated ontology used to model a wide range of geological (and many other) scientific concepts.

Through its current Geoscience Data Mondernisation Program (GDMP), GSQ intends to greatly increase the proportion of its data holdings that it makes publicly available from the current 10% to 90%, by 2021. This program is thought, by GSQ staff, to position GSQ at the cutting edge of government public data delivery both amongst Australia government organisations and its geological survey agency peers internationally.

In 2018, GSQ turned 150th years old making it one of the older geological agencies in the world today. Queensland's first geologists, Richard Daintree and Christopher Aplin, were appointed in April 1868.

== See also ==
- Geological Survey of Queensland web page
- Department of Natural Resources and Mines, Manufacturing and Regional and Rural Development
