= Royal Physiographic Society in Lund =

Royal Academy in Sweden

The Royal Physiographic Society in Lund (Swedish: Kungliga Fysiografiska Sällskapet i Lund), is one of the Royal Academies in Sweden. It was founded in Lund, on December 2, 1772, and received a Royal Charter by Gustav III, on March 6, 1778.

== See also ==
- Lund University
