= State Geologic and Subsoil Survey of Ukraine =

Ukrainian government agency

The State Geologic and Subsoil Survey of Ukraine or Ukrainian Geological Survey (UGS), is the national upstream regulator that issues exploration and production licenses for all mineral resources, supervises their performance, and carries out geologic assessments across the country.

They serve as an agrologist studying group for any ground, however, during the Russo-Ukrainian War, they have ceased many operations.
