= Quaternary geology =

Branch of geology that studies developments more recent than 2.58 million years ago

Quaternary geology is the branch of geology that study developments from 2.58 million years ago to the present. In particular, Quaternary geology studies the processes and deposits that developed during the Quaternary, a period characterized by glacial-interglacial cycles. Quaternary geology has developed over time from being originally a branch of historical geology to becoming a science on its own.

== Quaternary geochronology ==
Quaternary geological investigations that require the dating of rocks or sediments require a complementary array of methods to determine that age. Although radiometric dating has rapidly gained importance for Quaternary dating, there has historically been a reliance on chemical and biological traces, geomorphic, and relative dating (also known as correlative dating). Since Quaternary geology involves studying changes on the Earth's surface up to the present, Quaternary geologists benefit from the preservation of time-dependent chemical or biological processes. These methods include lichenometry, dendrochronology, and amino acid racemization dating.

== See also ==
- Geoarchaeology
- Geomorphology
- Hydrology
- Neotectonics
- Palynology
- Quaternary science
- Sedimentology
- Soil science
- Tephrochronology
