= Geological Survey of Sweden =

Swedish government agency for matters concerning geology

not to be confused with the Geologiska föreningen (Swedish: Geologiska föreningen)

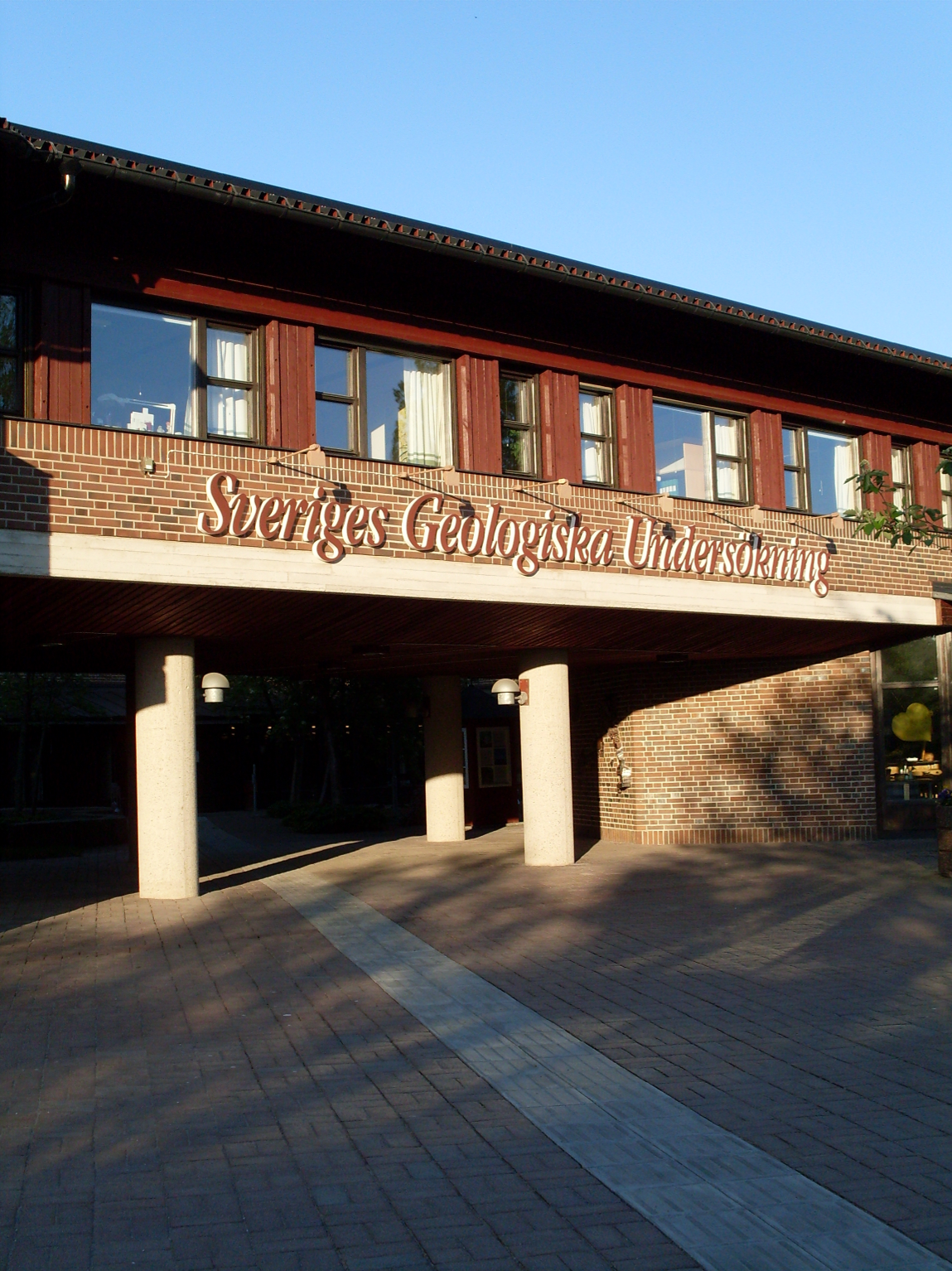
Swedish Geological Survey, Uppsala

Geological Survey of Sweden (Swedish: Sveriges geologiska undersökning, SGU) is a Swedish government agency that was founded by Axel Erdmann in 1858, that supervises all mineral deposits activities (surveys and extractions) in Sweden, and further the development of knowledge in the field of geology. The institution also has the right to issue instructions regarding groundwater administration in Sweden.

== Description ==
The purpose of the Geological Survey of Sweden is to undertake surveys and provide information on bedrock, soil and groundwater in Sweden. The SGU is in charge of providing local authorities with comprehensive geological information for environmental work and infrastructure planning. The SGU runs the Mineral Resources Information Office in Malå.

The SGU is responsible for maintaining the country's "High-Quality Groundwater" policy and set up the standards for "good" urban development, and to dispose properly of the country's unused civil defence readiness oil stocks facilities.

Two advisory bodies lead the SGU: the Advisory Council for Mineral Resources and the Advisory Council for Minerals Exploration. The SGU is the governing authority of the Mining Inspectorate, which issues permits for exploration and exploitation of mineral deposits in Sweden.

Each year, the SGU awards grants for targeted basic research and applied research in geosciences.

== Mineral archives ==
The Geological Survey of Sweden houses a rich collection of ore samples from all over the world. Visitors pay 1,000 Kronor (US$110) a day to examine the items on display. The national drill core archive in Malå features over 3000 kilometres of drill cores from across the nation.

== History ==
The Geological Survey of Sweden was founded in 1858.

The first verifiable documented attempt to locate iron ore deposits with magnetic methods (the compass method) in Sweden was recorded on 29 July 1668 by the prospector Jöns Persson. The first attempt but with electrical equipotential methods was recorded in 1906. In 1921, Centralgruppens Emmissons A.-B. used electromagnetic instruments for the first time in Sweden to locate iron ores. In 1959, a metal detector was first used for archeological prospection (Skedemosse site by Hagberg). GPR was first used in the country in 1976. Seismic methods were used only once, in 1992 in Birka.

In 2011, the Geology Survey of Sweden proposed a national strategy for mineral exploitation of the national land. The government published it in 2013, which led to more funding for survey-oriented work, including 200 km of archived drill core to be scanned, and the resulting hyperspectral imaging data analyzed.

In 2013, the SGU launched a domestic network to favour the development of geoparks in Sweden. One site of focus is the meteorite impact at the Siljan Ring (Siljansringen) in Dalarna.

In February 2018, the SGU published a report that highlighted the country's new mineral extraction opportunities regarding the rapid development of consumer electronics and the growing need for rare metals (graphite, lithium, cobalt, rare earth elements (REE) and tungsten), urging the government to finance more specific survey projects. A $1.3-million budget was approved for the SGU to survey the northern Norrbotten and Västerbotten provinces. The Swedish newspaper Svenska Dagbladet called Northern Sweden the "Mecca of Battery Metals", highlighting its rare metals potential. In November the same year, SGU agreed to help the State Geologic and Subsoil Survey of Ukraine to draft a Mineral Strategy Plan aligned with European standards.

In 2019, the SGU teamed up with the Geological Survey of Iran, the Indian Institute of Technology Bombay, and the Universities of Cardiff and Cape Town to chemically fingerprint the processes that led to formation of Kiruna-type iron ores, employing Fe and O isotopes (main elements in magnetite Fe_{3}O_{4}).
