= List of geoscience organizations =

This is a list of geoscience organizations, including such fields of geosciences as geology, geophysics, hydrology, oceanography, petrophysics, and related fields.

== Intercontinental organizations ==
- Anthropocene Working Group
- Association for Women Geoscientists (AWG)
- Association of Applied Geochemists
- Environmental and Engineering Geophysical Society
- Geochemical Society
- International Association for Engineering Geology and the Environment
- International Association for Mathematical Geosciences (IAMG)
- International Association of Cryospheric Sciences
- International Association of GeoChemistry
- International Association of Geomagnetism and Aeronomy
- International Association of Hydrological Sciences (IAHS/AISH)
- International Association of Sedimentologists
- International Association of Volcanology and Chemistry of the Earth's Interior (IAVCEI) – International non-governmental organization
- International Association for the Conservation of Geological Heritage ProGEO
- International Centre for Diffraction Data
- International Commission on Stratigraphy (ICS) – Non-governmental geological organization
- International Commission on the History of Geological Sciences
- International Continental Scientific Drilling Program
- International Geoscience Programme
- International Ichnological Association
- International Glaciological Society (IGS) – International glaciology academic organization
- International Mineralogical Association
- International Organization for Biological Crystallization
- International Permafrost Association
- International Union for Quaternary Research
- International Union of Crystallography
- International Union of Geodesy and Geophysics (IUGG) – International non-governmental organization
- International Union of Geological Sciences (IUGS) – International non-governmental organization
  - Geoscience Education, Training and Technology Transfer
- International Union of Soil Sciences (IUSS) – International scientific union
- OneGeology
- Paleontological Society (PS)
- Seismological Society of America (SSA) – International scientific society
- Society for Sedimentary Geology (SEPM) – Non-profit scientific society
- Society of Economic Geologists (SEG) – Scientific society
- Society of Exploration Geophysicists (SEG) – Nonprofit geoscience organization
- Society of Mineral Museum Professionals (SMMP) – Professional organization
- Society of Petrophysicists and Well Log Analysts (SPWLA)
- Society of Vertebrate Paleontology (SVP) – American professional organization

== Africa ==
- Council for Geoscience (CGS) – South African national science council
- Geological Society of South Africa (GSSA)
- Geological Survey of Tanzania
- Nigerian Geological Survey Agency
- Zimbabwe Geological Survey

== Asia ==
- Asia Oceania Geosciences Society (AOGS)
- Central Geological Survey (CGS) – Government agency in Taiwan
- Centre for Earthquake Studies – Pakistan
- Crystallographic Society of Japan – Japan
- The Chamber of Geophysical Engineers of Turkey
- China Geological Survey (GSC) – Chinese government agency
- Chinese Academy of Geological Sciences (CAGS)
- Faculty of Earth Sciences, King Abdulaziz University – Saudi Arabia
- Geological Society of Malaysia
- Geological Society of Sri Lanka
- Geological Survey of Bangladesh
- Geological Survey of Japan
- Geological Survey of Pakistan (GSP) – Government agency
- Israel Geological Society
- Philippine Institute of Volcanology and Seismology
- Saudi Geological Survey (SGS) – Saudi Arabian department
- Seismological Society of Japan
- Instituto de Geociências de Timor-Leste (IGTL)

=== India ===
- Geological Society of India
- Geological Survey of India – Indian governmental organization
- National Geophysical Research Institute
- Wadia Institute of Himalayan Geology

== Europe ==
- Albanian Geological Survey
- Czech Geological Society
- European Association of Geochemistry
- European Association of Geoscientists and Engineers (EAGE) – Professional organization for geoscientists and engineers
- European Association of Science Editors (EASE)
- European Crystallographic Association
- European Federation of Geologists (EFG)
- European Geosciences Union (EGU) – International science society
- GeoEcoMar – Romania
- Geologica Belgica – Belgian scientific journal published by the University of Liège Library
- Geological Survey of Austria (GBA)
- Geological Survey of Belgium (GSB)
- Geological Survey of Denmark and Greenland
- Geological Survey of Finland
- Geological Survey of Norway (NGU) – Norwegian government agence
- Geological Survey of Slovenia
- Geologiska föreningen – Sweden
- German Crystallographic Society
- German Geophysical Society (DGG; German: Deutsche Geophysikalische Gesellschaft)
- German Mineralogical Society (DMG; German: Deutsche Mineralogische Gesellschaft)
- Iceland GeoSurvey
- National Institute of Geophysics and Volcanology (INGV) – Research institute in Italy

=== British Isles ===
- Belfast Naturalists' Field Club – Northern Ireland
- British Crystallographic Association
- British Geological Survey (BGS)
- British Organic Geochemical Society (BOGS)
- British Society for Geomorphology
- Cambridge Crystallographic Data Centre – England
- Edinburgh Geological Society – Scotland
- Geological Curators' Group – England
- Geological Society of Glasgow – Scotland
- Geological Society of London (GSL) – England
- Geological Survey of Ireland
- Geologists' Association (GA)
  - Rockwatch
- Institute of Materials, Minerals and Mining
- Institute of Theoretical Geophysics
- Institution of Mining and Metallurgy
- Oxford Geology Group
- Mineralogical Society of Great Britain and Ireland
- Palaeontographical Society
- Palaeontological Association (PalAss) – Charitable organization
- Royal Astronomical Society (RAS) – British learned society and charity
- Royal Geological Society of Cornwall (RGSC) – England
- Royal Geological Society of Ireland
- School of GeoSciences, University of Edinburgh – Scotland
- Sedgwick Club – University of Cambridge, England
- South Wales Geologists' Association (SWGA) – Wales
- Westmorland Geological Society – England
- Yorkshire Geological Society – England

=== France ===
- Bureau de Recherches Géologiques et Minières
- École Nationale Supérieure de Géologie
- French Crystallographic Association
- Société géologique de France

=== Russia ===
- Geophysical Service of the Russian Academy of Sciences
- Russian Mineralogical Society
- Siberian Research Institute of Geology, Geophysics and Mineral Resources
- Trofimuk Institute of Petroleum-Gas Geology and Geophysics
- V. S. Sobolev Institute of Geology and Mineralogy

== Americas ==
- Institute on Lake Superior Geology – US and Canada (Lake Superior region)
- Mexican Geological Society (SGM) – Mexican learned society
- National Association of Geoscience Teachers (NAGT) – North American organization
- Pan American Institute of Geography and History

=== Canada ===
- Alberta Geological Survey
  - Mineral Core Research Facility
- Association of Professional Geoscientists of Ontario – Professional organization of Canada
- Atlantic Geoscience Society
- CAMESE (Canadian Association of Mining Equipment and Services for Export) – Trade organization based in Mississauga, Ontario
- Canadian Geophysical Union
- Canadian Institute of Mining, Metallurgy and Petroleum (CIM)
- Canadian Society of Petroleum Geologists – Canadian professional society
- Decennial Mineral Exploration Conferences (DMEC)
- Geological Association of Canada
- Geological Survey of Canada (GAC) – Canadian government agency
- Geological Survey of Newfoundland and Labrador – Government operated scientific research agency
- Lithoprobe (dissolved)
- Ontario Geological Survey
- Prospectors & Developers Association of Canada (PDAC)

=== Central and South America ===
- Colegio de Geólogos – Chile
- Colombian Geological Survey
- Costa Rican Directorate of Geology and Mines
- INGEMMET – Peru
- National Geology and Mining Service – Chile
- Servicio Geológico Minero – Argentina
- Sociedad Geológica del Perú
- Sociedade Brasileira de Geofísica – Brazil
- UWI Seismic Research Centre – Trinidad

=== United States ===
- American Association of Petroleum Geologists (AAPG) – Professional geological association
- American Crystallographic Association
- American Gem Society (AGS), also known as American Gemological Society – American trade association
- American Geosciences Institute (AGI) – Nonprofit scientific federation
- American Geophysical Union (AGU) – Nonprofit organization of geophysicists
- American Institute of Mining, Metallurgical, and Petroleum Engineers, also known as Society for Mining, Metallurgy, and Exploration (SME)
- American Quaternary Association
- Association for the Sciences of Limnology and Oceanography (ASLO), also known as American Society of Limnology and Oceanography
- Association of Environmental & Engineering Geologists (AEG)
- The Clay Minerals Society (CMS) – US-based non-profit organization
- Earth Science Women's Network (ESWN)
- Environmental and Engineering Geophysical Society (EEGS)
- Gemological Institute of America (GIA) – Research institute in Carlsbad, California
- Geological Society of America (GSA) – Nonprofit organization dedicated to geoscience
- Geoscience Information Society (GSIS)
- Keck Geology Consortium
- Lamont–Doherty Earth Observatory
- Mineralogical Society of America (MSA) – Scientific organization promoting mineralogy
- National Association of Black Geoscientists (NABG)
- National Center for Earth-surface Dynamics
- National Cooperative Soil Survey (NCSS) – Program to understand and manage US soils
- National Speleological Society (NSS) – Organization for exploration, conservation, and study of caves in the United States
- Paleontological Research Institution (PRI) – U.S. non-profit organization
- Soil Science Society of America (SSSA) – American scientific organization
  - National Society of Consulting Soil Scientists (NSCSS) – American scientific and professional society – dissolved
- United States Earth Science Organization (USESO)
- United States Geological Survey (USGS) – Scientific agency of the US government
  - United States Geological Survey Library

==== Regional US ====
- Arizona Geological Society
- Arkansas Geological Survey
- Berkeley Geochronology Center
- California Geological Survey
- Delaware Geological Survey
- Delaware Mineralogical Society
- Geological Society of Washington (GSW) – Learned society for geology
- Indiana Geological and Water Survey
- Jackson School of Geosciences – University of Texas at Austin
- Kansas Geological Survey
- Kentucky Geological Survey
- Louisiana Geological Survey
- Michigan Geological Survey
- Mineral Core Research Facility
- Minnesota Geological Survey
- New York Mineralogical Club
- Oklahoma Geological Survey
- Oregon State Board of Geologist Examiners (OSBGE)
- Pacific Section
- Pennsylvania Geological Survey
- Pittsburgh Association of Petroleum Geologists (PAPG)
- Pittsburgh Geological Society (PGS)
- Rocky Mountain Association of Geologists (RMAG) – Non-profit organisation in Denver, Colorado
- Southern California Earthquake Center
- Utah Geological Survey

== Oceania ==
- Australian Geoscience Council Inc (AGC) - Umbrella organisation - Australian non-profit
- Australian Institute of Geoscientists (AIG) - Australian non-profit
- Australian Institute of Mining and Metallurgy (AusIMM) - Australian non-profit
- Australian Society of Exploration Geophysicists (ASEG) - Australian non-profit
- Geological Society of Australia (GSA) – Australian non-profit
- Geoscience Australia – Agency of the Australian Government
- Geological Survey of Queensland
- Geological Survey of South Australia
- Geological Survey of Victoria
- Geological Survey of Western Australia
- GNS Science – New Zealand
- Petroleum Exploration Society of Australia (PESA) - Australian non-profit
- The Australian and New Zealand Geomorphology Group (ANZGG) - Trans-Tasman non-profit
