= Mining in Costa Rica =

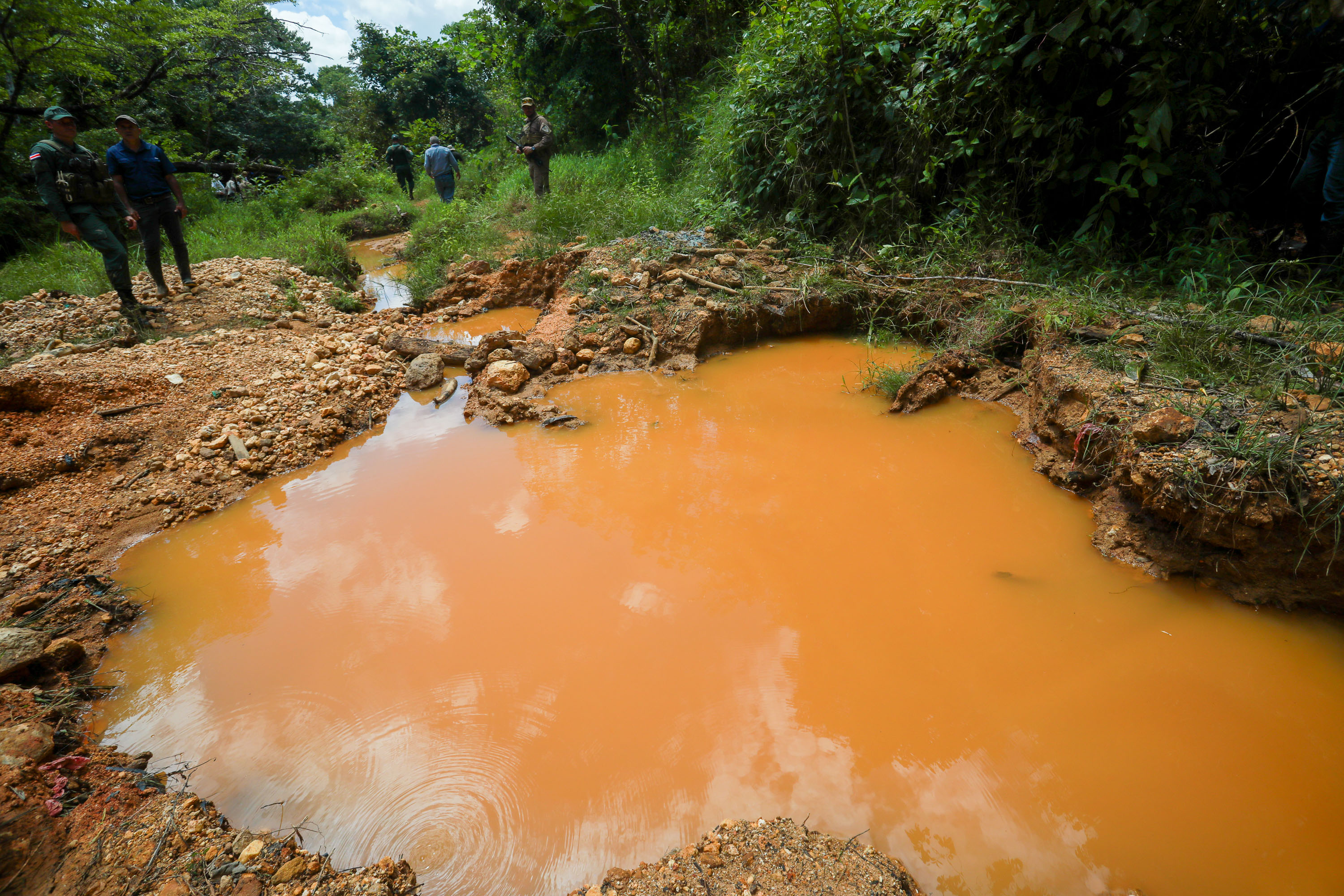
Artisanal gold mining in Costa Rica.

Costa Rica has an active metalliferous mining industry producing gold and a quarrying industry producing aggregates such as limestone, clay, silica and diatomite.

== History ==
Costa Rica became known as the "Rich Coast" to Spanish settlers because of the rich goldworking by the native cultures. Juan Vazquez de Coronado is said to have been the first European settler to attempt mining in the country, with limited success.

Mining for gold in Costa Rica began proper following the discovery of the Avocado Mines (Minas del Aguacate) by Bishop Garcia, Bishop of Costa Rica, in 1815. The discovery was announced by Don Rafael Gallegos, the second president of Costa Rica, and named Sacra Familia (Holy Family). A gold rush occurred and Upon hearing about the discovery, Richard Trevithick who was then in Peru, travelled to Costa Rica in 1824 to work the Sacra Familia mines under the Anglo-Costa Rica Mining Company; the project was said to be unsuccessful. Other attempts by Cornish miners are said to have occurred in the 1830s and 1840s.

A "second cycle" of mining occurred in the early 20th century following closure of most of earlier mines by the 1870s.

=== Notable Mines ===
As described by Reitz (1902).

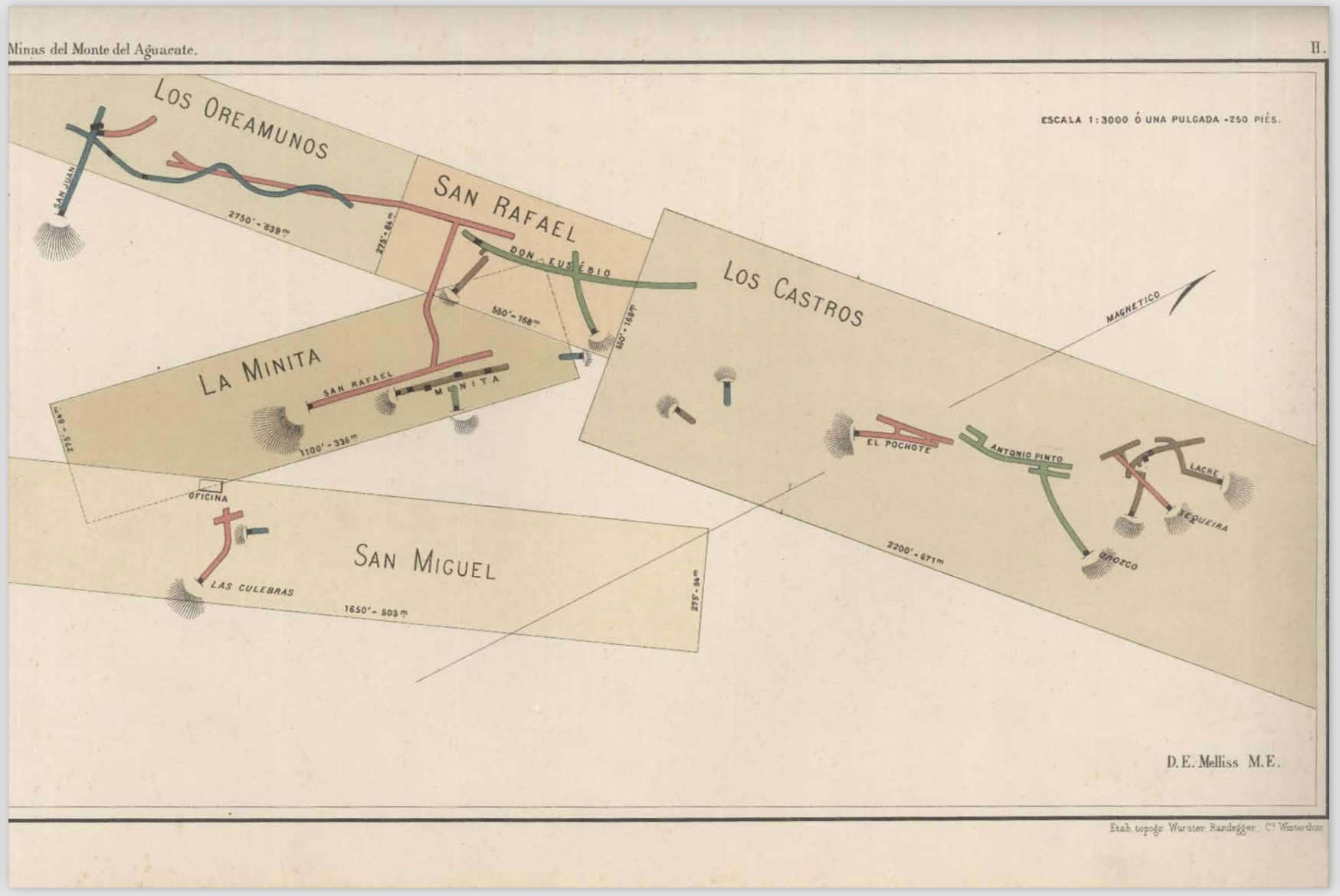
Plan of the Aguacate gold mines.

==== Avocado District ====
- Aguacate Mines - this consisted of approximately 6 smaller workings: the Main Lode, La Minita (discovered in 1832), San Miguel (discovered in 1826 and worked until 1862), Guapinol (discovered 1823), El Balsa (discovered and worked 1825, also known as the veta Oreamunos or the Mina de San Rafael. Minted Costa Rica's first gold coin), La Cigueña (between Guapinol and La Cigueña) and Don Eusebio (part of San Rafael).
- Sacra Familia Mines - adjoining the Aguacate mines on the northwest. Prior to closure in 1884, the mine had its own stamping mill, ores were transported by oxcart. Some of the individual workings were known as Cardinilla, Potrero Alto and Sobre Cañon de San Francisco. There was an arrastra situated on the Rio Quebrada Honda.
- Los Castros - adjoining the Aguacate Mines on the northeast on the continuation of the Oreamunos lode. Discovered in 1822, its constituent workings were known as Don Ricardo, El Manto, El Pochote, Don Antonio Pinto, Lacre , Sequiera and Don José Antonio Castro.
- El Porvenir - west of the Aguacate Mines on the Rio Machuca, a short distance north of San Mateo. In 1902 it was being worked by the Rio Grande Gold Mining Company.
- Quebrada Honde Mine - adjoining the Sacra Familia Mines on the west on the Rio Quebrada Honde. Worked three lodes to a maximum depth of 400 ft. Closed by 1857.

==== Gold Mountain District ====
- Trinidad Mine - worked by an English company in 1902.
- La Union - worked by the San Francisco based Union Mining Company in 1902.
- Macacona Mine - closed c.1870.
- Bella Vista and la Montezuma - situated near the village of Miramar, Puntarenas district.

==== Abangares District ====
- Abangarez Gold Fields, Limited - worked lodes known as Tres Hermanos (6 to 20 ft wide) and the Big Gilo (6 to 12 ft).
- Tres Amigos Mine - worked by the Boston Mines Company.
- Las Cañas Syndicate - worked a lode known as the Esperanza.
- Guanacaste Syndicate - worked lodes known as the Gier and the Oracu.

== Mining ==
While some 17 metalliferous commodities are known to have occurrences, only gold, silver and manganese have been worked productively.

Gold Production
Year	Kg
2013	1500
2014	1350
2015	950
2016	750
2017	4255
2018	5200
2019	4500
2020	599
2021	647
Total	19,751

== Quarrying ==
In 2021 1,510,654m^{3} limestone, 80m^{3} kaoline, 244,635m^{3} silica and 14,642m^{3} diatomite were produced.

== Gallery ==
Aguacate Mines
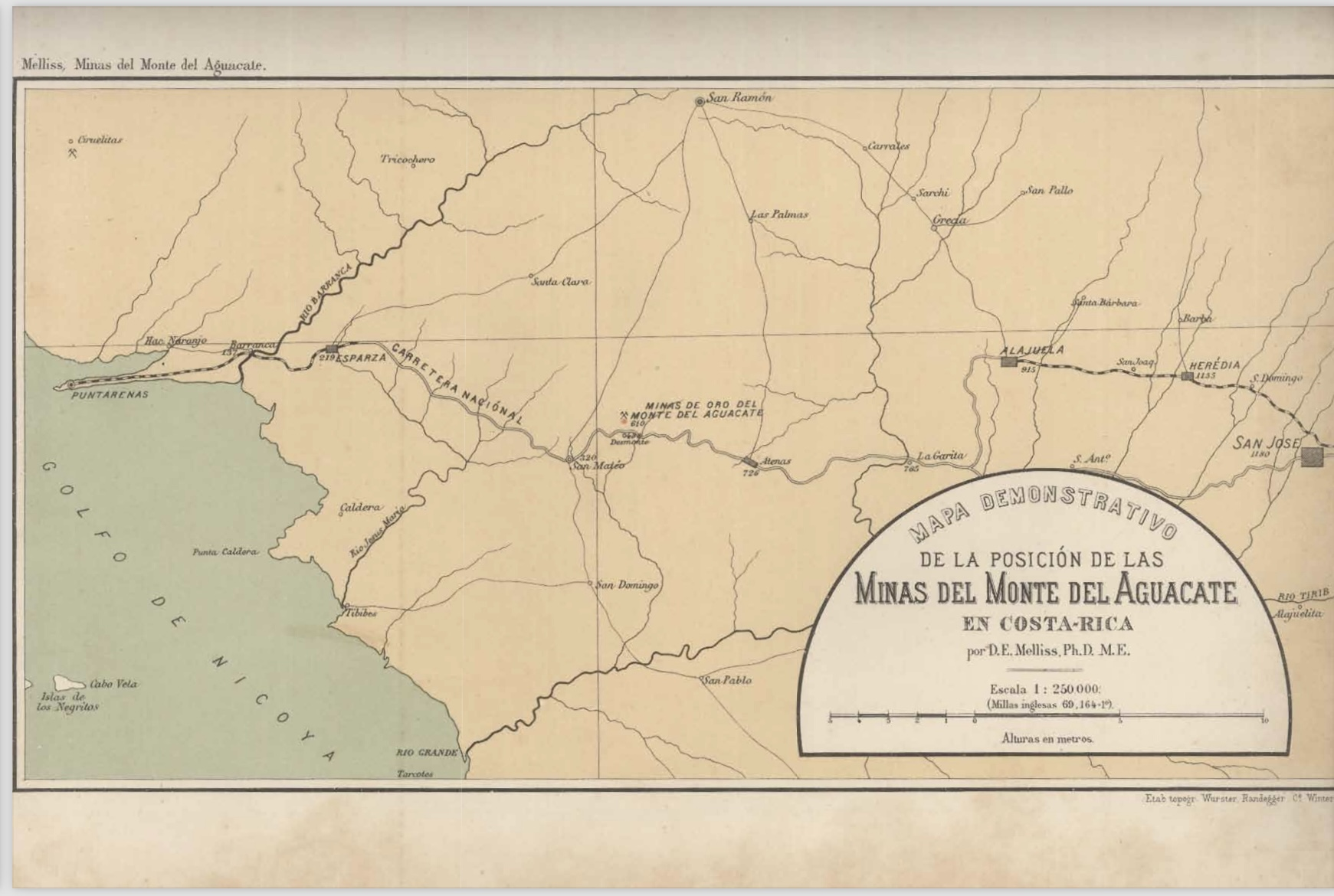

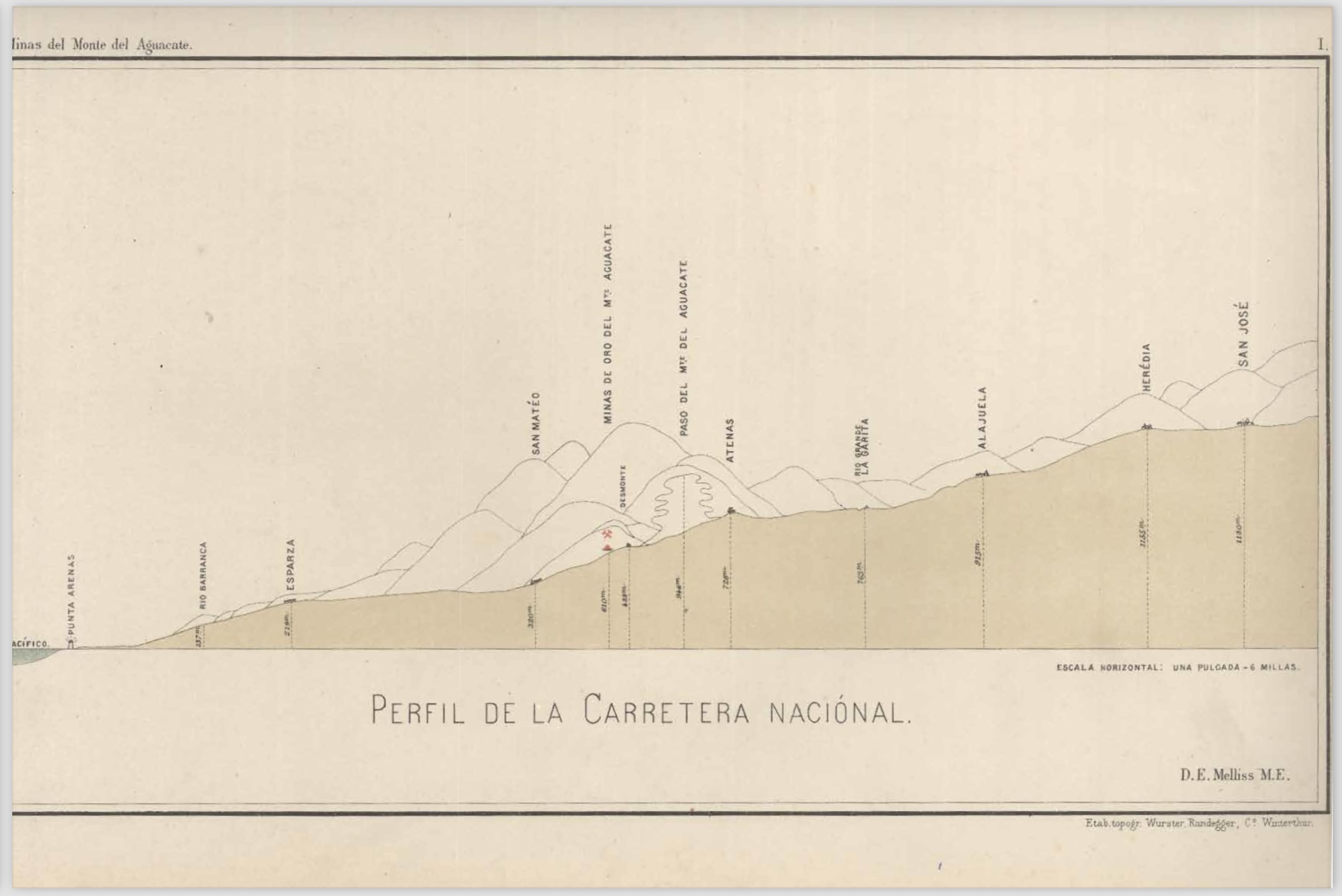

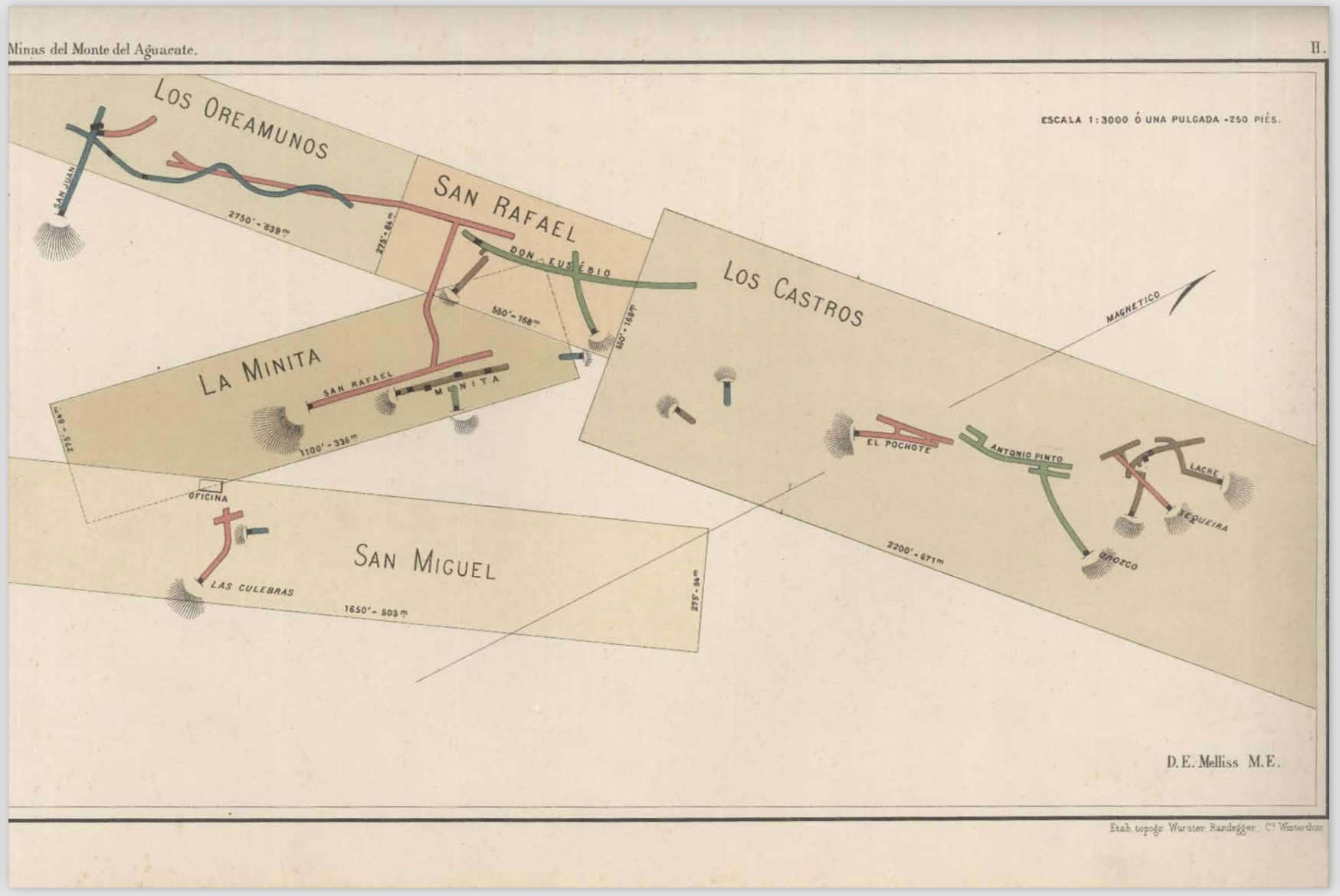

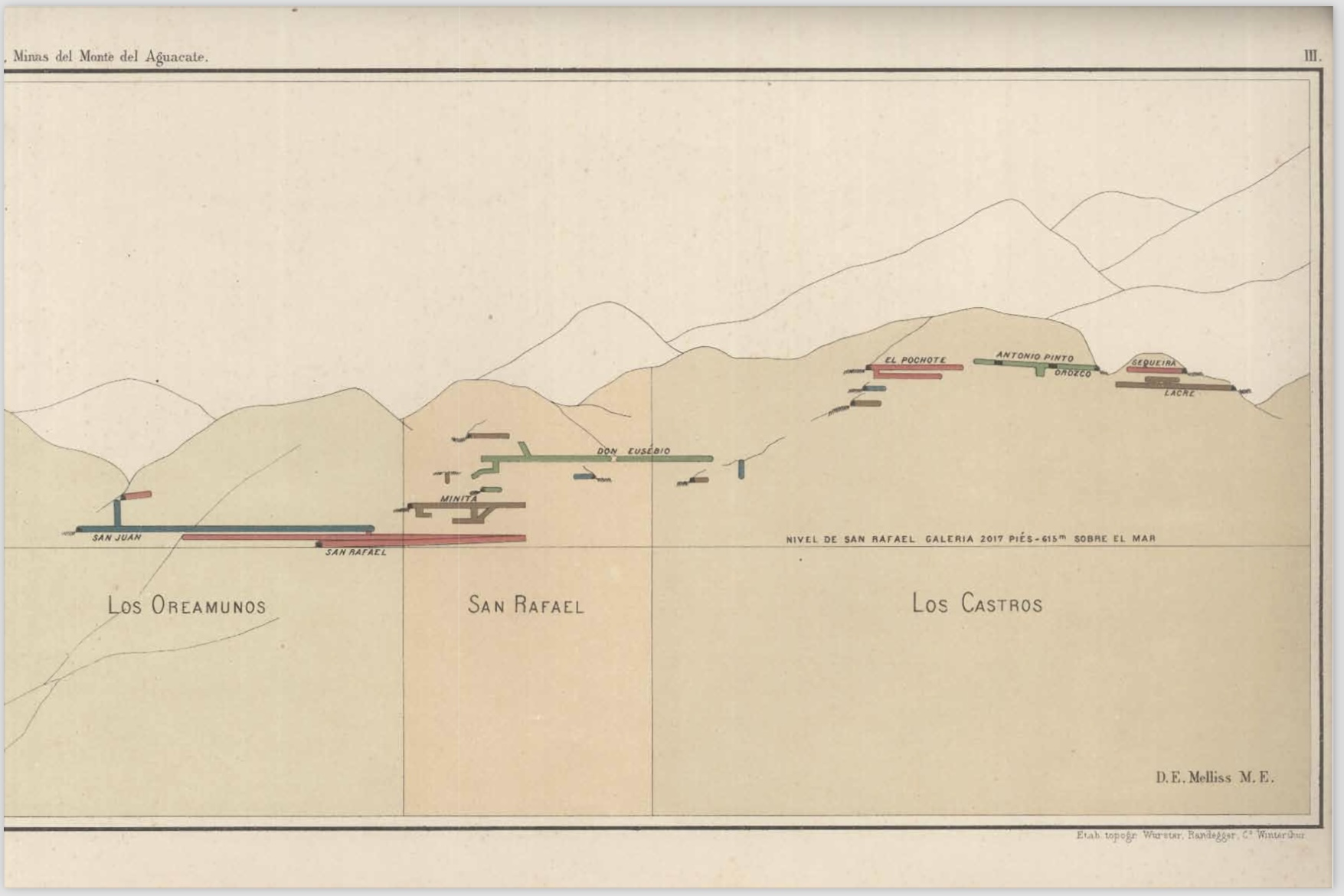

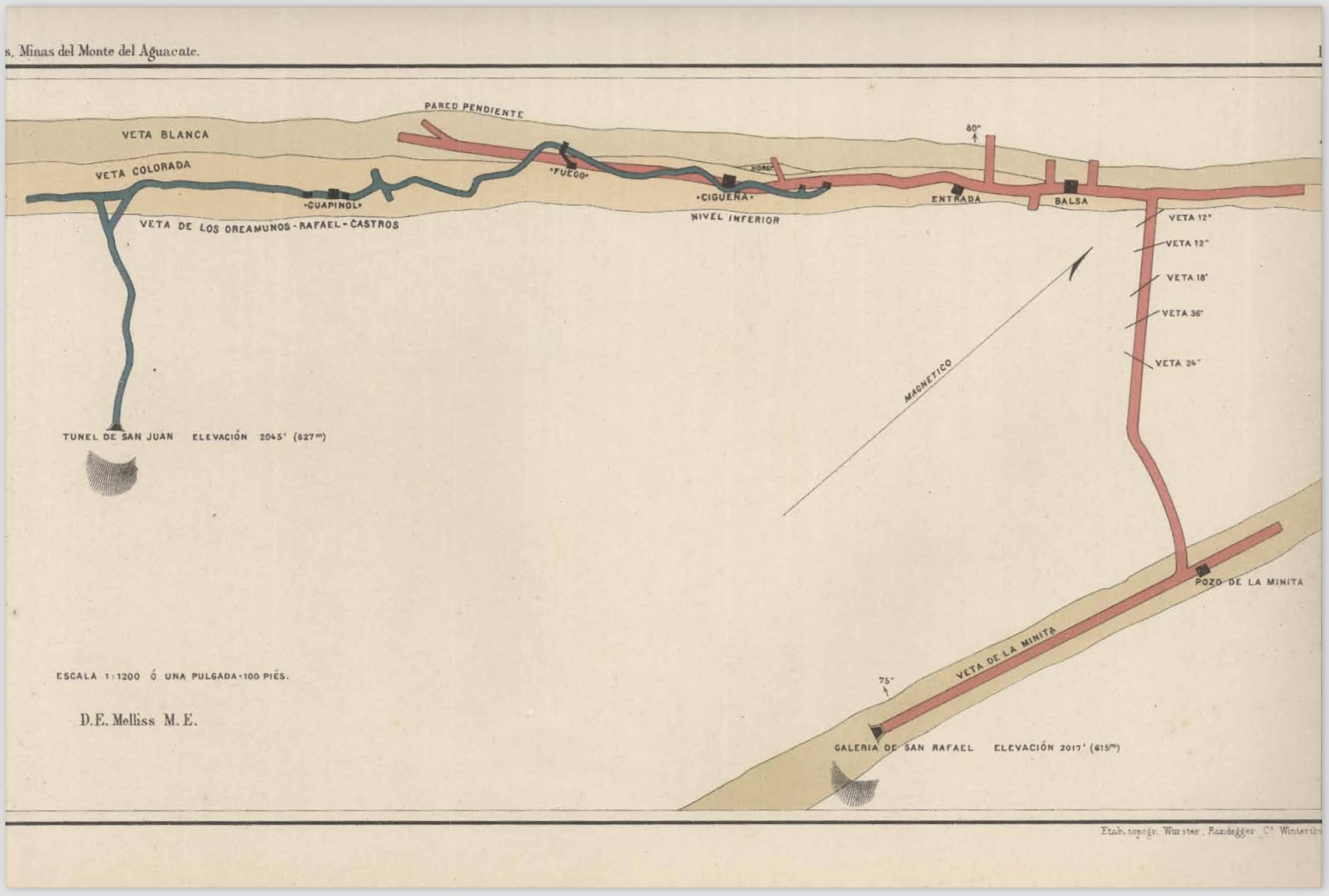

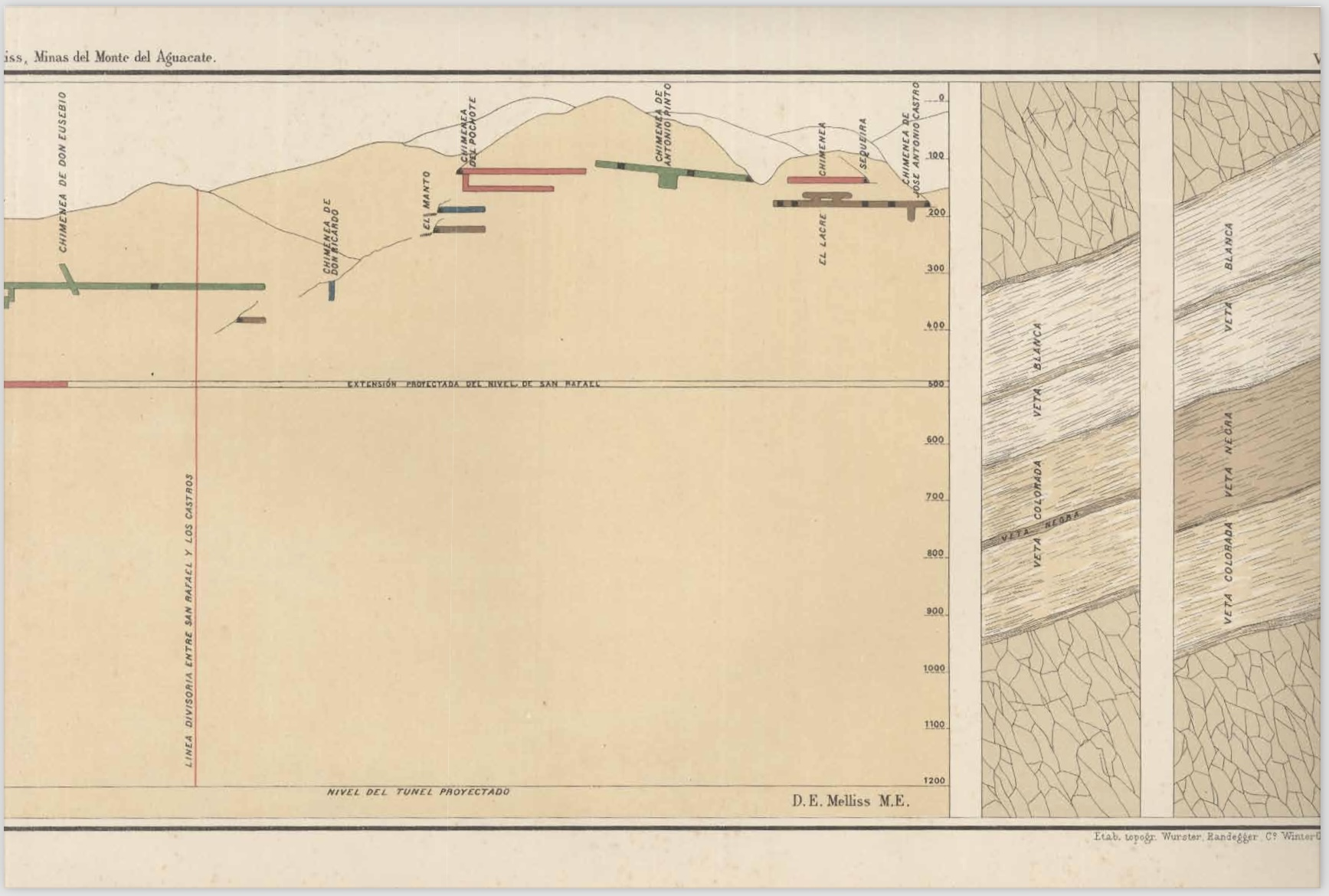

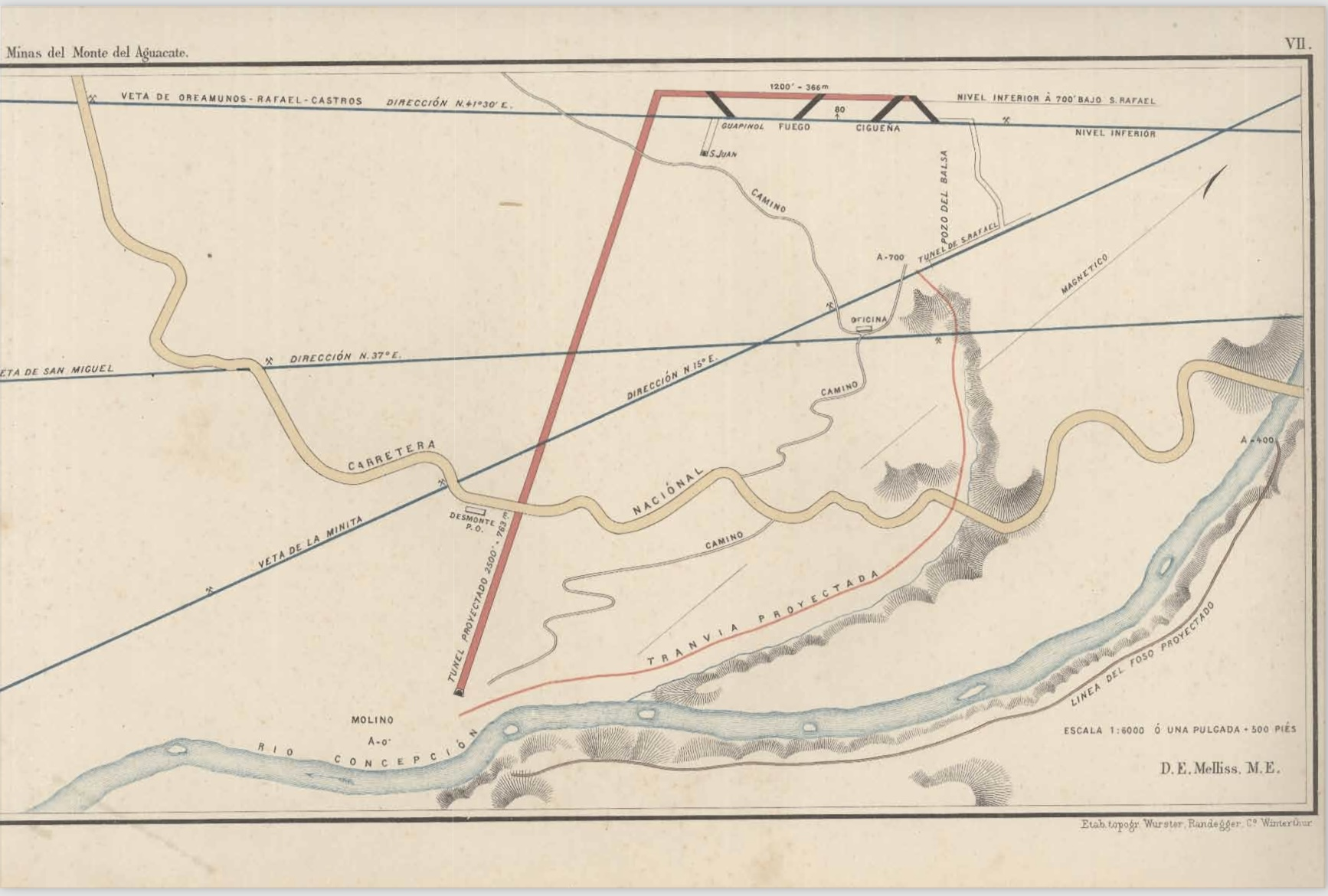

== See also ==
- Costa Rican Directorate of Geology and Mines
