= Douglas Bassett =

Douglas Bassett may refer to:

- Douglas Bassett (media executive) (born 1940), Canadian media executive
- Douglas Bassett (geologist) (1927–2009), Welsh geologist and director of the National Museum Wales
