= Amphibian Species of the World =

Database that provides information of all amphibia species of the world

- Website type: Wildlife database
- Available in: English
- Owners: American Museum of Natural History, New York, USA
- Creator: Darrel R. Frost
- Website: amphibiansoftheworld.amnh.org
- Commercial: No
- Launched: Version 2.0: 22 July 1999. (first online database version)
- Current status: Active

Amphibian Species of the World 6.2: An Online Reference (ASW) is a herpetology database. It lists the names of frogs, salamanders and other amphibians, which scientists first described each species and what year, and the animal's known range.

The American Museum of Natural History hosts Amphibian Species of the World, which is updated by herpetologist Darrel Frost. As of 2024, it contained more than 8700 species.

== History ==
The Association of Systematics Collections (ASC) started this project in 1978 because the Convention on Trade in Endangered Species of Fauna and Flora (CITES) needed a database for animals. (The ASC later changed its name to Natural Science Collections Alliance.) The ASC's Stephen R. Edwards wrote Mammal Species of the World first and started Amphibian Species of the World second. Edwards decided to write about living amphibians because Richard G. Zweifel had just composed a large list of amphibian names and because experts from the University of Kansas were available to assist him. Darrel Frost joined the project to help Edwards. Frost planned to write Turtle and Crocodilian Species of the World next, but he left to complete his Ph.D. instead.

The first version of the catalogue was published as a book in 1985, and well received by specialists in the field.

In 1989, the ASC gave the copyright for Amphibian Species of the World to the Herpetologists' League, and they added more amphibians to the database. The League and American Museum of Natural History put Darrel Frost in charge of the project. At the time, Frost was a curator at the American Museum of Natural History. Frost added more information for professional herpetologists to use and made many corrections. He added more species that had been discovered since 1985. The project's own page notes that there are ten times as many amphibian species known to science today than were known in the mid-1980s.

In July 1999, the catalogue was first published on the internet, in its 2.0 version. New versions were added in 2004, 2006 and 2007. The 6.0 version, published in 2014, allows for real-time modifications.

The 6.2 version was published in January 2023. As of August, the website contains 8,674 species and over 17,848 references.

== Critical response ==
According to Amphibians.org, "For three decades ASW has been the primary reference for amphibian taxonomy." In 2013, Frost won the Sabin Award for his work on Amphibian Species of the World.

== See also ==
- Mammal Species of the World
- AmphibiaWeb

== Other websites ==
- Site hosted by American Museum of Natural History
