= Streak seeding =

Method to induce crystallization

Streak seeding is a method first described during ICCBM-3 by Enrico Stura to induce crystallization in a straight line into a sitting or hanging drop for protein crystallization by introducing microseeds. The purpose is to control nucleation and understand the parameters that make crystals grow. It is also used to test any particular set of conditions to check if crystals could grow under such conditions.

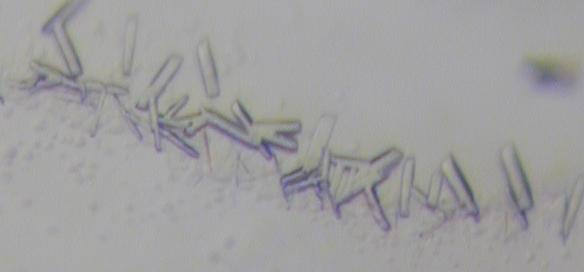
Result from streak seeding of protein crystals.

The technique is relatively simple. A cat whisker is used to dislodge seeds from a crystal. The whisker is passed through the drop starting from one side of the drop and ending on the opposite side of the drop in one smooth motion. To allow for vapour diffusion equilibration, the well in which the drop has been placed is resealed. The same procedure is repeated for all the drops whose conditions need testing.
