= Denise M. Stone =

American geologist

Denise Maureen Stone
- Education: Texas Christian University (1979); Memphis State University (1981); Jones Graduate School of Business (1996 - 1997)
- Occupation: Geologist
- Years active: 1979–2003
- Known for: Charles H. Taylor fellowship member

Denise Maureen Stone is an American geologist. Stone is best known for her work in the oil and gas sector as a geological consultant and geologist, and her work as a member of the American Association of Petroleum Geologists (AAPG).

Stone's published works focus on petroleum exploration and the benefits of fieldwork. She has peer-reviewed 20 publications and presentations on international and domestic explorations and production of oil and gas.

== Early life ==
In an interview with AAPG candidates, Stone states that she took a strong interest in geology in her first year of college. She decided to major in the field and was eventually encouraged by her professor to join the AAPG board. According to Stone, what sparked her interest was seeing the “organization to the solid earth beneath my feet”, as well as “being in the field, and seeing the relationships,” as opposed to reading about them in textbooks.

== Career and education ==
Stone completed her bachelor's degree at Texas Christian University in 1979, followed by a master's degree at Memphis State University in 1981; both in the field of geology. She also attended Jones Graduate School of Business from 1996 to 1997 as part of its management program. During her studies, she worked at Superior Oil Company, and joined the American Association of Petroleum Geologists (AAPG) in 1979. She has since held many positions in the AAPG over the course of her career and into her retirement.

Stone became a licensed professional geoscientist and spent 40 years working in Houston, Texas, in the oil and gas industry and also worked on oil and gas exploration projects in the North Sea. She worked fourteen years as a senior geologist at Superior Oil International, and in Mobil. Stone joined the Amoco Production Company in Houston as an exploration geologist and petrophysicist from 1985 until 2003. She also worked on international exploration projects in various countries.

Stone has since retired and moved to Centennial, Colorado. She has been an independent geologist consultant since 2003.

As of 2021, Stone is a retiree, the treasurer of the AAPG, and a member of the field trip committee at the Rocky Mountain Association of Geologists. She is also a member of the geoscience study group Colorado School of Mines where she gives talks on geoscience topics.

== Awards and honors ==
Stone held the name of advisor of treatise from 1988 to 1996. She became technical session chair for ACE Dallas in 1991. She received two HoD Certificates of Service Awards one in 2007 for 9 years of service, and another in 2011 for 15 years of Service. In 2016, Stone accepted the HoD House Long Service Award for service to this Authority for a continuous period of 20 years or more. In 2013, she became a Charles H. Taylor fellowship member.

== Publications ==
Title	Year	Publisher(s)	Co-authors	Ref.
Opon Gas Field Colombia: Part 1 – Geoscience Description, Well Design and Well Test Performance	1996		Huffmyer, W.A., Mamerow, B.S., Greener, J.M.	https://onepetro.org/SPEATCE/proceedings-abstract/96SPE/All-96SPE/SPE-36466-MS/58885
Opon gas renews interest in the hydrocarbon prolific middle Magdalena basin, Colombia	1996	AAPG	Elliott, R., Latimer, G., and Steuer. M.	https://www.osti.gov/biblio/421210
Caspian Sea Region Hydrocarbon Development: opportunities and Challenges	1997	AAPG	Leaonard, R.	https://www.searchanddiscovery.com/abstracts/html/1997/intl/abstracts/1394e.htm
Value of Geological Fieldwork	1999	AAPG		https://pubs.geoscienceworld.org/books/book/1896/chapter-abstract/107166253/Value-of-Geological-Fieldwork?redirectedFrom=fulltext
A major's View of Rockies Gas: Focus on Wamsutter in the Greater Green River basin Of Wyoming	2002	AAPG	David, S. M.	https://www.searchanddiscovery.com/abstracts/html/2002/rms/images/stone.htm
Exploration History and Future Potential of the Cook Inlet Basin, Alaska	2012	AAPG		https://archives.datapages.com/data/HGS/vol55/vol55no2/27.htm
Oil and Gas Fields of the Cook Inlet Basin, Alaska	2014	AAPG	David, M. H.	https://pubs.geoscienceworld.org/aapg/books/book/1507/Oil-and-Gas-Fields-of-the-Cook-Inlet-Basin-Alaska
