= British Organic Geochemical Society =

British Organic Geochemical Society (BOGS) is an organization that aims to promote, exchange and discuss all aspects of organic geochemistry. It also aims to facilitate academic and social networking between British organic geochemists.

== History ==
BOGS was formed in 1987. The founding members were Prof G.A. Wolff (University of Liverpool), Dr G.D. Abbott (Newcastle University), Dr J. McEvoy (then at University of Bangor) and Prof S.J. Rowland (University of Plymouth).

== Meetings ==
The first meeting of BOGS was held in Bangor (Wales) on 13–15 July 1988. The society meets annually, usually at (or near) a university department with links to research in organic geochemistry.

BOGS meetings are usually held over two days, and involve oral presentations (lasting 15 minutes), poster presentations and social events (i.e. evening meal).

Annual meetings have been held at Liverpool (1989), Bideford (1990), Newcastle-upon-Tyne (1992), Plymouth (1993), Aberdeen (1994), Bristol (1995), Liverpool (1996), Newcastle-upon-Tyne (1997), Plymouth (1998), York (1999), Bristol (2000), Gregynog, Wales (2001), Newcastle-upon-Tyne (2002), Plymouth (2003), Nottingham (2004), Liverpool (2005), Milton Keynes (2006). BOGS did not meet in 2007, as this would have clashed with the 23rd International Meeting of Organic Geochemistry (IMOG) event, which occurred a few months later in Torquay. Since 2007 BOGS has met at Newcastle (2008), Bristol (2009), Manchester (2010), Swansea (2011), Leeds (2012), Plymouth (2013), Liverpool (2014), Glasgow (2015), Imperial College London (2016) and Open University, Milton Keynes (2017).

== Membership ==
It is free to become a member of BOGS. To join the mailing list for BOGS, an email is sent to the BOGS webmaster at calewis@plymouth.ac.uk.

== See also ==
- List of geoscience organizations
