= Environmental and Engineering Geophysical Society =

- Abbreviation: EEGS
- Formation: 1992
- Type: Not-for-profit
- Purpose: Near-Surface Geophysics, Environmental Geophysics, Engineering Geophysics
- Location: 1391 Speer Boulevard; Suite 350; Denver, CO 80204 USA
- Coordinates: 39.685°N 104.937°W
- Members: 417 individuals
- Key people: Michael Kalinski (president); Janet Simms (president elect)
- Website: eegs.org

The Environmental and Engineering Geophysical Society (EEGS) is an international, applied scientific organization (not-for-profit corporation) that has 700 members. One of the society’s major activities is producing its annual meeting, the Application of Geophysics to Engineering and Environmental Problems (SAGEEP). It develops and distributes a peer-reviewed scientific journal, the Journal of Environmental and Engineering Geophysics (JEEG), as well as an electronic quarterly newsletter, FastTIMES. It publishes, markets, and distributes books and CD-ROMs on the application and use of near-surface geophysical technologies, both in print and electronically (EEGS Research Collection, is an online reference featuring the entire collection of the organization’s JEEGs and SAGEEP proceedings).

== Mission ==
- to promote geophysics as applied to environmental and engineering problems,
- to foster scientific interests of geophysicists and their colleagues in other related sciences and engineering,
- to set a high professional standard for its members, and
- to promote fellowship and cooperation among persons interested in the science.

== History ==
EEGS was founded in 1992 and is incorporated in the State of Colorado as a not-for-profit corporation and has approximately 700 international members. There are student chapters in North America and Canada. In addition, EEGS maintains ties with the near-surface geophysics section (formerly EEGS-European Section) of the European Association of Geoscientists and Engineers, the Near-Surface Geophysics Section of the Society of Exploration Geophysicists, the Near-Surface Focus Group of the American Geophysical Union, and formal affiliated society agreements with several international professional societies.

== Meetings ==
=== SAGEEP ===
The annual meeting of the organization, known as the Symposium on the Application of Geophysics to Environmental and Engineering Problems (SAGEEP), is held in the late winter or early spring and provides geophysicists, engineers, geoscientists and end-users from around the world an opportunity to discuss near-surface applications of geophysics and learn about developments in near-surface geophysics.

Since 1988 at the Colorado School of Mines, the symposium has been held over a five-day period at locations throughout the United States, with 150 oral and poster presentations, educational workshops, vendor presentations, and a commercial exhibition. A set of proceedings, comprising technical papers presented at the conference, is available online at EEGS’ Research Collection site.

=== EEGU ===
Environmental and Engineering Geophysical University (EEGU) is held over three days in parallel with the regular SAGEEP technical sessions. EEGU introduces nontraditional geophysical conference attendees (regulators, environmental program managers, consultants, and students who are new to near-surface geophysics) to incorporating geophysical approaches into characterization or remediation programs or to evaluating the suitability of geophysical methods for general classes of environmental or engineering problems. Sessions are led by experts in the application of seismic, electrical, gravity, magnetics, and ground-penetrating radar methods.

== Publications ==
=== Journal of Environmental & Engineering Geophysics ===
A peer-reviewed journal, Journal of Environmental and Engineering Geophysics (JEEG), is published quarterly and distributed via mail to the EEGS membership and academic libraries. It is available online as part of EEGS’ Research Collection. Articles from recent issues (2005 forward) are available online to members of subscribing institutions through GeoScienceWorld (www.geoscienceworld.org).

=== FastTIMES ===
An electronic newsmagazine, FastTIMES, is also produced quarterly and is distributed via email and as a downloadable file through the society's web page.

== Awards ==
=== EEGS/Geonics Early Career Award ===
The EEGS/Geonics Early Career Award acknowledges academic excellence and encourages research in near-surface geophysics. The award is presented to a full-time university faculty member who is within ten years post-completion of his or her Ph.D. The award acknowledges significant and ongoing contributions to the discipline of environmental and engineering geophysics.

=== EEGS/NSGS Frank Frischknecht Award ===
The joint EEGS/NSGS Frank Frischknecht Award was established to recognize extraordinary leadership in advancing the cause of near surface geophysics through long-term support of the near-surface geophysics community. Such leadership is often boldly displayed by an invention, a new methodology or technique, a theoretical or conceptual advancement, or an innovation that transforms the nature and capabilities of near-surface geophysics.

== See also ==
- Geological Society of America
- Society of Exploration Geophysicists
- List of geoscience organizations
