= Natural Science Collections Alliance =

- Abbreviation: NSCA
- Type: non-profit
- Purpose: Natural Science Collection Advocacy
- Location: Washington, D.C., United States
- Public Policy Director: Robert Gropp, Ph.D.
- Website: nscalliance.org

The Natural Science Collections Alliance is a Washington, D.C.–based non-profit organization supporting natural science museums, botanical gardens, universities and other institutions that maintain natural science collections.

As of 2013, there were 57 member institutions including 22 museums such as the American Museum of Natural History and North Carolina Museum of Natural Science, 29 colleges and universities including Yale University, Harvard University, Arizona State University and the University of Florida, and 6 Arboretums and Botanical Gardens including the New York Botanical Garden and U.S. National Arboretum. Affiliations are also maintained with professional societies such as the Herpetologists' League, Society of Mineral Museum Professionals and Society of Vertebrate Paleontology.

The alliance produces publications on natural science collections and their use in scientific study. Recent publications include one on the importance of bees to the ecosystem overall.

The organization also hosts an annual meeting attended by member institutions. This serves as a forum for discussions about best practices, government funding and regulation, and collection management.
