= American Association of Petroleum Geologists =

Professional geological association

- Formation: 1917
- Type: Professional association
- Headquarters: Tulsa, Oklahoma
- Location: United States
- Members: 17,000
- Leader: President
- Key people: Richard Fitz, Denise M. Stone
- Website: www.aapg.org

The American Association of Petroleum Geologists (AAPG) is a professional geological association founded in 1917 and headquartered in Tulsa, Oklahoma. Its activities include recognizing contributions to petroleum geoscience through professional awards and promoting student participation through the annual Imperial Barrel Award competition. The Correlation of Stratigraphic Units of North America (COSUNA) was an AAPG project that produced sixteen charts depicting the stratigraphy of North America.

AAPG has supported research and professional activities relating to petroleum geoscience, including work on plate tectonics, sedimentary basins, shale resources, and drilling hazards. In 2006, the association's decision to give its Journalism Award to Michael Crichton, whose novel State of Fear rejected scientific evidence for anthropogenic global warming, drew criticism. The controversy also drew attention to AAPG's position on climate change. In 2007, the association revised its formal position, acknowledging human activity as a contributor to increasing atmospheric carbon dioxide while stating that its members remained divided over the degree of influence of anthropogenic CO_{2} on climate.

== Awards ==
At its annual conventions and international conferences AAPG recognizes the distinguished contributions in the field of petroleum geosciences with various awards, including the Sidney Powers Memorial Award, Michel T. Halbouty Outstanding Leadership Award, Grover E. Murray Memorial Distinguished Educator Award, Wallace Pratt Memorial Award, and Ziad Rafiq Beydoun Memorial Award. The AAPG IBA award is given immediately following the IBA competition that is held at that year's annual convention.

=== AAPG IBA (Imperial Barrel Award) ===
AAPG promotes student involvement in the profession by holding an annual Imperial Barrel Award competition where geoscience graduate students are encouraged to explore a career in the energy industry. In this global competition, university teams analyze a dataset (geology, geophysics, land, production infrastructure, and other relevant materials) and deliver their results in a 25-minute presentation. The students' presentations are judged by industry experts, providing the students a real-world, career-development experience.

IBA offers students and their faculty advisor a chance to win accolades for themselves and cash prizes for their schools, and winning teams travel free to the annual AAPG convention to network with both future colleagues and future employers.

== Correlation of Stratigraphic Units of North America ==
The Correlation of Stratigraphic Units of North America (COSUNA) was a project of the AAPG which resulted in the publication of sixteen correlation charts depicting modern concepts of the stratigraphy of North America.

== Pioneering positions ==
The AAPG has supported the investigation of the earth, and over the years, ideas about how oil is formed have changed. In the 1960s, the AAPG supported the then-revolutionary idea of plate tectonics (vs. isostasy), and looked at plate tectonics as a key to the evolution of basins, and thus the formation of oil and gas. An example is Tanya Atwater's work on plate tectonics. As a whole, women geoscientists have played an important role in the AAPG's 100-year history as scientists and leaders.

Since that time, the AAPG has worked closely with scientific organizations such as the USGS to apply new scientific breakthroughs to the generation, migration, and entrapment of oil and gas. The results have brought new understanding of ultra-deepwater reservoirs (such as off the coast of Brazil). Further understanding about kerogen typing and natural fracture development led to a better understanding of shale resources, and contributed to the "shale revolution." In addition, the AAPG has looked closely at the role of independent oil companies in the roll-out of new technologies used in new types of plays such as shales.

The AAPG has supported geomechanics in order to be able to predict pore pressure and avoid drilling hazards. The AAPG has also been supportive of investigations having to do with the impact of policies of disposing of produced water by injecting it into deep formations. Workshops and forums have been held since 2009 (Geosciences Technology Workshops) to analyze the problems and to discuss solutions. They have been held throughout the world, and are documented through the presentations. The presentations from the workshops have been made available for free via the AAPG's open access online journal, Search and Discovery.

== Global warming controversy ==
In 2006, the AAPG was criticized for selecting author Michael Crichton for their Journalism Award for Jurassic Park and "for his recent science-based thriller State of Fear", in which Crichton exposed his rejection of scientific evidence for anthropogenic global warming. Daniel P. Schrag, a geochemist who directs the Harvard University Center for the Environment, called the award "a total embarrassment" that he said "reflects the politics of the oil industry and a lack of professionalism" on the association's part. The AAPG's award for journalism lauded "notable journalistic achievement, in any medium, which contributes to public understanding of geology, energy resources or the technology of oil and gas exploration." The name of the journalism award has since been changed to the "Geosciences in the Media" Award.

The criticism drew attention to the AAPG's 1999 position statement formally rejecting the likelihood of human influence on recent climate. The Council of the American Quaternary Association wrote in a criticism of the award that the "AAPG stands alone among scientific societies in its denial of human-induced effects on global warming."

=== 2007 AAPG revised position ===
Acknowledging that the association's previous policy statement on Climate Change was "not supported by a significant number of our members and prospective members", AAPG's formal stance was reviewed and changed in July 2007.

The new statement formally accepts human activity as at least one contributor to carbon dioxide increase, but does not confirm its link to climate change, saying its members are "divided on the degree of influence that anthropogenic CO_{2} has" on climate. AAPG also stated support for "research to narrow probabilistic ranges on the effect of anthropogenic CO_{2} on global climate."

AAPG also withdrew its earlier criticism of other scientific organizations and research stating, "Certain climate simulation models predict that the warming trend will continue, as reported through NAS, AGU, AAAS, and AMS. AAPG respects these scientific opinions but wants to add that the current climate warming projections could fall within well-documented natural variations in past climate and observed temperature data. These data do not necessarily support the maximum case scenarios forecast in some models."

== Affiliated organizations ==
Organizations may request affiliation with AAPG if they meet a set of criteria including goals compatible with those of AAPG; membership of at least 60% professional geologists with degrees; dissemination of scientific information through publications or meetings; and membership not restricted by region.

- Pittsburgh Association of Petroleum Geologists
- Pittsburgh Geological Society
- Canadian Society of Petroleum Geologists
- Pacific Section of AAPG (PSAAPG)

== See also ==
- Betty Ann Elliott
- Randi Martinsen
- Fred Meissner
- List of geoscience organizations
- Society of Exploration Geophysicists
- Society of Petroleum Engineers
- European Association of Geoscientists and Engineers
- Denise M. Stone
