= Decennial Mineral Exploration Conferences =

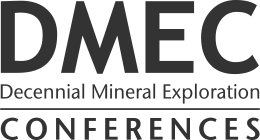
- Formation: 1967; 59 years ago
- Founded at: Canada
- Type: voluntary association
- Region served: Worldwide
- Methods: Conferences, Publications
- Website: DMEC

The Decennial Mineral Exploration Conferences (DMEC) is a Canadian voluntary association dedicated to the advancement of geoscience applied to exploration for mineral resources. The inaugural 1967 conference "Canadian Centennial Conference on Mining and Groundwater Geophysics", held in Ottawa, Canada, was organized by the Geological Survey of Canada as part of the Canadian Centennial. While the original session focussed on mining and groundwater geophysics, the purpose of subsequent conferences expanded to include geochemistry, and other geoscience disciplines as they are applied in mineral exploration.

Conferences have been held in Canada every 10 years since, and are attended by geoscience delegates from around the world.

== Proceedings ==
The organizing committees have published the proceedings of each meeting for the benefit of and reference by the global exploration community, with the intention that each proceeding provides a 10-year perspective of the state of applied geoscience in mineral exploration.

- Exploration 67: Mining and Groundwater Geophysics
- Exploration 77: An International Symposium on Geophysics and Geochemistry Applied to the Search for Metallic Ores
- Exploration 87: Third decennial International Conference on Geophysical and Geochemical Exploration for Minerals and Groundwater
- Exploration 97: Geophysics and Geochemistry at the Millenium
- Exploration 07: Exploration in the New Millenium
- Exploration 17: Integrating the Geosciences: the Challenge of Discovery

== See also ==
- List of geoscience organizations
- Society of Exploration Geophysicists
- Society of Economic Geologists
