= Thomas Richard Owen =

Welsh geologist

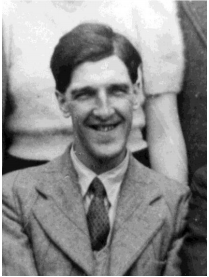
- Born: 1918
- Died: 1990 (aged 71–72)
- Occupation: Geologist
- Notable work: The Geological Evolution of the British Isles, Geology Explained in South Wales

Thomas Richard Owen (1918–1990) was a Welsh geologist with an encyclopaedic knowledge of the rocks of Wales, ranging from regional stratigraphy and tectonics to geomorphology and marine geology. His research was mainly on the Carboniferous rocks of South Wales.

== Career ==
Born in Aberdare to a mining family, Dick Owen won a scholarship to Merthyr Tydfil Grammar School and graduated with first class honours in geology from Swansea University in 1939. He carried out his postgraduate studies there for the next two years, researching the structure of the Vale of Neath, and was associated with teaching at the university for a further 35 years.

His association with Swansea was interrupted by the Second World War, during which he served as a meteorological officer in the RAF, rising to the rank of Flight lieutenant. While he was based in the Azores, one of his most memorable experiences was deciding, on meteorological grounds, whether it was suitable for Churchill and Roosevelt to hold their famous meeting in the mid-Atlantic.

His work on the Vale of Neath was published by the Geological Society in 1954. He also wrote and edited a series of papers and books that included Geology Explained in South Wales and The Upper Palaeozoic and Post-Palaeozoic Rocks of Wales. Owen’s almost cartoon-like geological sketches became his hallmark, and illustrated his profound desire for people of all backgrounds and abilities to appreciate the geology of Wales.

Owen chaired the South Wales Group of the Geologists’ Association, and an annual T.R. Owen memorial lecture has been instituted in his memory.

== Publications ==
- T.R. Owen (Author), Philip Gray (Editor) 1973 (ISBN 071535860X) Geology Explained in South Wales Publisher: David & Charles
- T.R. Owen (Editor) 1974 (ISBN 0708305555) The Upper Palaeozoic and Post-Palaeozoic Rocks of Wales Publisher: University of Wales Press
- T.R. Owen 1976 (ISBN 0080204600) The Geological Evolution of the British Isles Publisher: Pergamon Press
