= Randi Martinsen =

American geologist

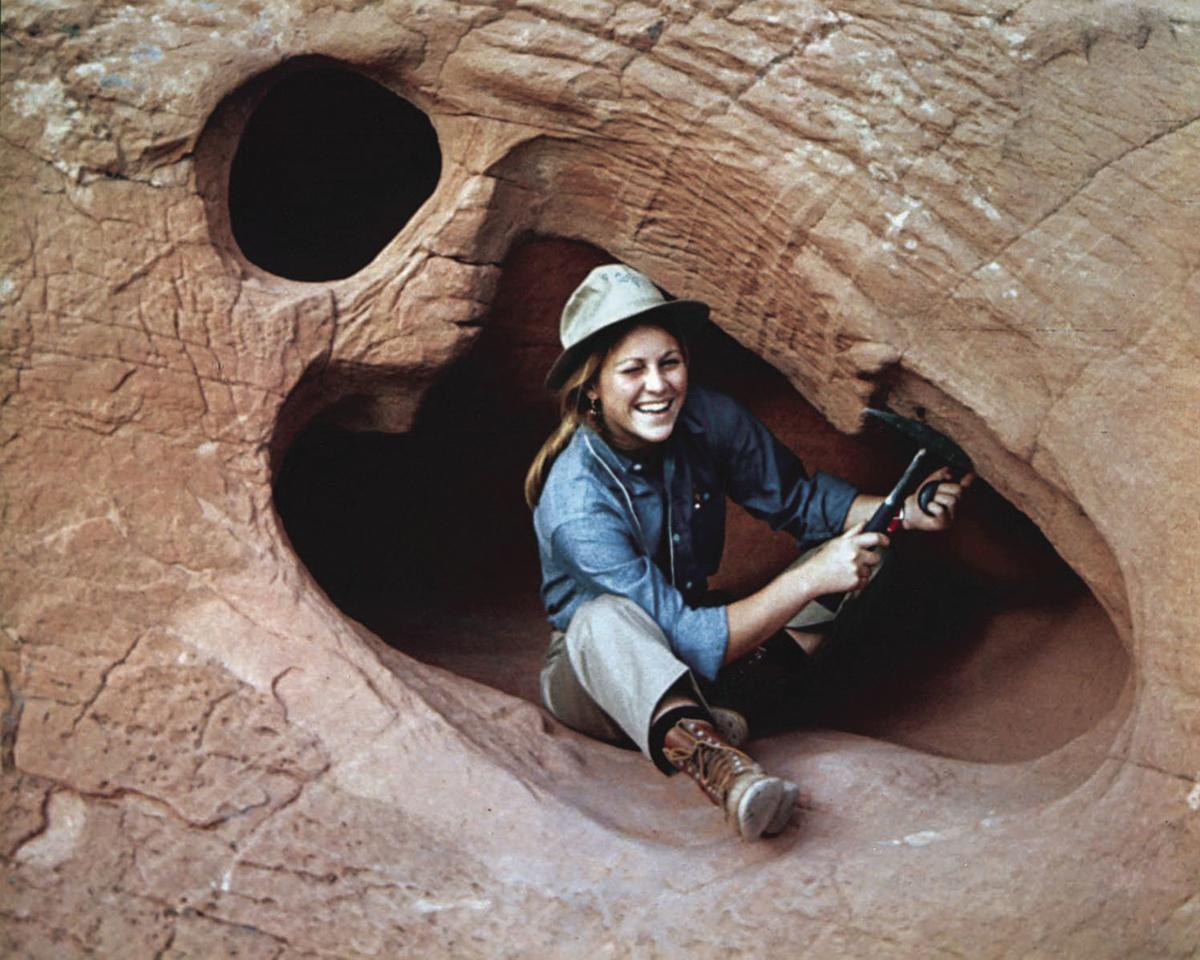
- Randi Martinsen in Wyoming after receiving her Master's in Geology
- Born: October 1950 (age 75); New York City, New York, U.S.

Randi Martinsen is an American geologist and senior lecturer in the Department of Geology and Geophysics at the University of Wyoming.

== Overview ==
Martinsen has worked extensively on the Western Interior Cretaceous basin with a particular interest in stratigraphic trap exploration, paleotectonic influences on depositional systems and clastic reservoir characterization.

Martinsen is a former president (2014 - 2015) and the second woman ever elected to head the American Association of Petroleum Geologists Foundation (AAPG), an organization that provides educational programs, scientific research, and engineering services in communities around the world.

== Early life and education ==
Martinsen was born and raised in New York City. She spent most of her summers as a child in the Ramapo Mountains of New Jersey, which sparked her interest in the natural world.

Five years after starting work at Cities Service Company in Denver, she married Jim Steidtmann, a geology professor at the University of Wyoming.

In 1971, she received her Bachelor of Science (BS) in Earth and Space Science at the State University in Stony Brook, New York. In 1975, she completed her MS in geology at Northern Arizona University; she was the only woman in her class.

Martinsen spent most of her career as a senior lecturer at the University of Wyoming for the petroleum geology program before retiring in 2015. The courses she taught included physical geology, advanced stratigraphy, petroleum geology, methods in petroleum geology, and topics in geology. Throughout her career, she also taught courses in petroleum geology and engineering, clastic depositional systems, sequence stratigraphy, reservoir characterization and physical geology.

Martinsen's hobbies include equestrian three-day events, traveling, scuba diving, and skiing. She has two children, Dana and Matt and one stepchild, David. She has three grandchildren: Lauren, Kaya, and Rylan.

== Career ==
From 1974 to 1979, Martinsen worked as a geologist for the Cities Service Company in Denver, Colorado. Martinsen later worked as a consulting geologist in Laramie, Wyoming from 1980 to 2011. She took up a position as a lecturer at the University of Wyoming's Department of Geology and Geophysics in 1981 and later became a senior lecturer from 1995 to 2014. In 2011, Martinsen worked as a principal at Hydrocarbon InSight, LLC. In 2015, Martinsen briefly returned to the University of Wyoming's Department of Geology and Geophysics to work as a lecturer emeritus. From 2014 to 2015, Randi Martinsen served as the American Association of Petroleum Geologists' president. She retired in 2015.

After becoming the first woman to be sworn in as an expert in the Wyoming and Gas Commission in the 1970s, Martinsen was stopped at the Casper Petroleum Club upon entering because she was a woman. In 1979, Martinsen submitted an abstract to the Rocky Mountain Section American Association of Petroleum Geologists about the Hartzog Draw, a giant oil field. This proposal was rejected because the program chair believed that "it was too important for a female to present." Upon hearing the reason for the rejection, Martinsen fought back by forcing the program chair to reverse his decision and later offered her to present.

== Research ==
Randi Martinsen has made contributions to the field of geology related to the exploration and production of hydrocarbons from stratigraphically trapped accumulations as well as the assessment of the different types and characteristics of reservoir quality rocks found located within the systems of the Cretaceous Western Interior Seaway systems. Martinsen identified the significance of the remnants of sedimentary rock deposits that originate from an existing depositional system for the construction of accurate stratigraphic frameworks, facies models, and paleogeographic maps. Martinsen studied depositional remnants within the Western Interior of the Cretaceous basin and documented that these remnants have a vastly different geometry compared to the strata located underneath them. Her research emphasized the importance of identifying this phenomenon in relation to the field of petroleum geology on the basis that if depositional systems are not correctly identified, then accurate exploration and production strategies for the reservoirs cannot be developed and, in return, could result in inefficient petroleum extraction from these systems.

Her recent projects include:

- Synsedimentary tectonic influences on basin physiography and depositional regime;
- Sequence stratigraphic analysis and reservoir characterization of the tight gas sands in the Mesaverde Group, Greater River Basin, Wyoming; and
- Influence of syn-sedimentary faulting on the distribution and reservoir quality of sandstones.

While teaching at the University of Wyoming, she was an Ex Officio which she contributed to: Exploration Memoir No. 1, A New Approach to Exploring for Anomalously Pressured Gas Accumulations (2005).

== Awards and honors ==
During her time working with the AAPG, Martinsen received honors and awards including the Stratigraphic Compartmentalization of Reservoir Sandstones: Examples from the Muddy Sandstone Power River Basin, Wyoming and Montana, AAPG Memoir 61 (1995), the A.I Levorsen Memorial Award (1979), two Certificates of Merit (2001 and 2006), and the Distinguished Service Award (2009). She was a recipient of WGA's Frank A. Morgan award.

Martinsen was first woman sworn in before the Wyoming Oil and Gas Conservation Commission. In a Forbes article written on May 10, 2020, Martinsen is recognized as contributing to the evolution of women in the field of geology. She served as President of the American Association of Petroleum Geologists alongside other outstanding women in the field.

== Publications ==
Martinsen has published 27 peer-reviewed articles and presentations with the AAPG and other organizations. The focus of these pertain to depositional system analysis, sequence stratigraphy, tectonics and sedimentation, anomalous pressures, hydrocarbon accumulation, and tight gas sandstones. Along with these topics, Martinsen has also published course notes and field trip guides from her work at the University of Wyoming.

- Martinsen, R.S., 2003, Depositional remnants, part 1: Common components of the stratigraphic record with important implications for hydrocarbon exploration and production: AAPG Bulletin, v. 87, p. 1869-1882
- Martinsen, R.S., 2003, Depositional remnants, part 2: Examples from the Western Interior Cretaceous basin of North America: AAPG Bulletin, v. 87, p. 1883-1909
- Randi S. Martinsen1 (2001). "ABSTRACT: Wave Dominated versus Current Dominated Shorelines in the Cretaceous Western Interior Seaway". AAPG Bulletin. 85.
- OLSON, MARK, RANDI MARTINSEN, DIANE (1999). "Abstract: Improving Reservoir Characterization Techniques with Behind Outcrop Coring and Logging Studies: Preliminary Results of the Rock Springs Drilling Project, Southwestern Wyoming ". AAPG Bulletin. 83.
- MARTINSEN, RANDI S., University of (1998). "Abstract: Depositional Remnants: Products of the Interplay Between Synsedimentary Tectonics and Changes in Relative Sea Level". AAPG Bulletin. 82.
- Martinsen, R.S., 1997, Stratigraphic controls on the distribution of pressure compartments, in R.C. Surdam (ed.), Seals, Traps and the Petroleum System: AAPG Memoir, p. 223-241.
- Randi Martinsen, William Iverson, R (1996). "Facies, Faults and Potential Sweet Spots in a Tight Gas Reservoir: Almond Formation, Wyoming: ABSTRACT". AAPG Bulletin. 80
- Martinsen, Randi S.; Jiao, Zun S.; Iverson, William P.; Surdam, Ron C. (1994). "Paleosol and Subunconformity Traps: Examples from the Muddy Sandstone, Powder River Basin, Wyoming"
- Ole J. Martinsen (2), Randi S. Mart (1993). "Mesaverde Group (Upper Cretaceous), Southeastern Wyoming: Allostratigraphy Versus Sequence Stratigraphy in a Tectonically Active Area". AAPG Bulletin. 77.
- Randi S. Martinsen (1990). "Cretaceous Stratigraphy, Laramie Basin, Southeastern Wyoming: ABSTRACT". AAPG Bulletin. 74.
- TILLMAN, R. W.; MARTINSEN, R. S. (1987), "SEDIMENTOLOGIC MODEL AND PRODUCTION CHARACTERISTICS OF HARTZOG DRAW FIELD, WYOMING, A SHANNON SHELF-RIDGE SANDSTONE", Reservoir Sedimentology, SEPM (Society for Sedimentary Geology), pp. 15–112
- MARTINSEN, R. S.; TILLMAN, R. W. (1985), "HARTZOG DRAW, A NEW GIANT OIL FIELD", Shelf Sands and Sandstone Reservoirs, SEPM (Society for Sedimentary Geology), pp. 349–350
- Roderick W. Tillman, Randi S. Marti (1983). "Possible Tectonic Influence on and Facies Distribution of Shannon Ridge Sandstones, Wyoming: ABSTRACT". AAPG Bulletin. 6
- Martinson, R. S. (1998) Compartmentalization of Sandstone Reservoirs Due to Syndepositional Faulting, Almond Formation, Washakie Basin, Wyoming
- Martinson, R.S. (1989) Haystack Mountains Formation (Randi S. Martinson and Roderick W. Tillman)
