= Geological Society of Sri Lanka =

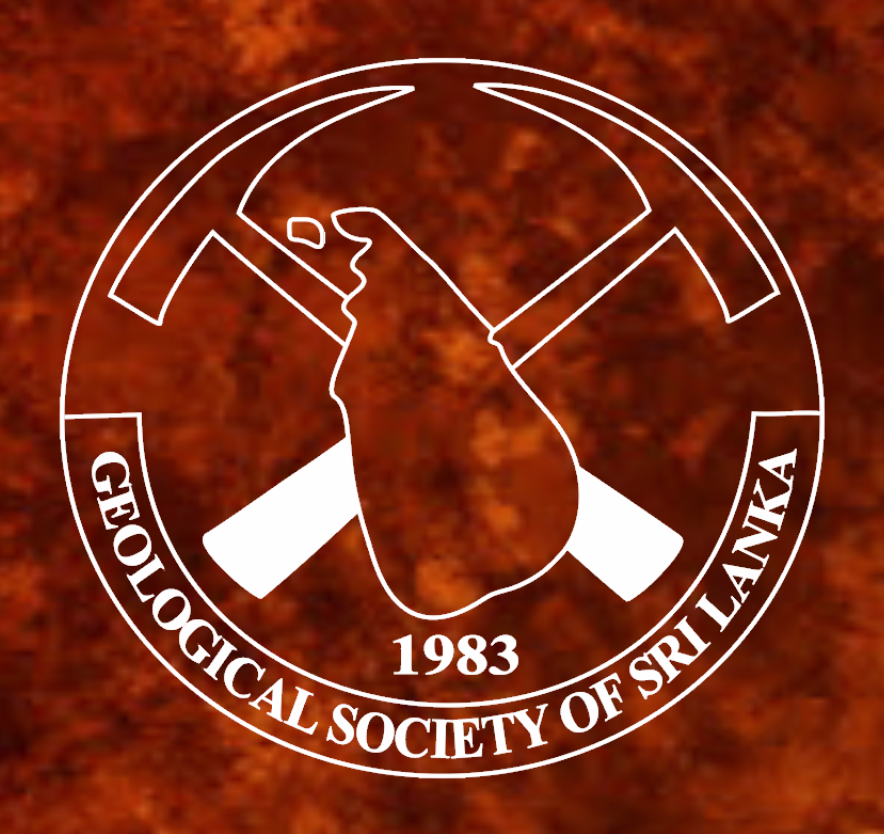
Logo of the Geological Society of Sri Lanka. https://www.gssl.lk/

The Geological Society of Sri Lanka (Sinhala: ශ්‍රී ලංකා භූ විද්‍යා සංගමය) is the premier professional forum dedicated to promotion of Geology/Geological Sciences in Sri Lanka. The GSSL is the platform for Sri Lankan Geologists in both academia and industries to join together and share their knowledge, research findings and experience while disseminating knowledge in geological sciences to the general public in Sri Lanka.

== Establishment ==
The society was established in 1983 at the Department of Geology, University of Peradeniya by a group of senior academic and professional geologists of Sri Lanka. Despite academic geological studies in Sri Lanka dating back to at least 1902 of Ananda Coomaraswamy's times, the country had never before had a forum for geologists such as the Society.

== Administration ==
The society consists of a council with a yearly term. The council is composed of President, Secretary, Past President, Vice President, President-Elect, Treasurer, Two Co-Editors and Six other Council Members. The Geological Society of Sri Lanka has two classes of membership: Life Membership and Ordinary Membership.

== Awards administered ==
The society recognises the geologists of the country considering their outstanding contributions to uplift the knowledge in geology of Sri Lanka. It also encourages young graduates and undergraduates for their merit performance in Geology. The GSSL has presided over the creation of the Ananda Coomaraswamy medal, which is awarded to eminent Sri Lankan and foreign scientists who have made a remarkable contributions to understanding the Geology of Sri Lanka. This medal is named to honour the late Dr. Ananda Coomaraswamy for his pioneering contribution to the geological knowledge in Sri Lanka. The medal is usually awarded in the month of August, and the awardee delivers a public oration elaborating his/her contribution or on a chosen topic of research interest, to the nation.

The society also present annually the award of P.G. Cooray medal for the outstanding young geologist in a given year, below 35 years of age. The GSSL also provide scholarships such as the P.W. Vitanage scholarship for promising Special Degree Geology undergraduates and the Tissa Munasinghe scholarship for geology undergraduates. In 2016, the GSSL established the L.J.D. Fernando Award for the "Distinguished Geologist", which is awarded for the first time at the Annual Technical Sessions in 2017 .. The GSSL also provide scholarships such as the P.W. Vitanage Memorial Scholarship for the best Honours Degree Geology undergraduate of the University of Peradeniya. The Tissa Munasinghe scholarship and G.M. Jayatilake scholarship are another two awards by the GSSL dedicated for Geology undergraduates of the University of Peradeniya based on their need and performances.

== Sri Lanka Earth Science Olympiad ==
The Society partners with the University of Peradeniya to organise the Sri Lankan Earth Science Olympiad Competition. The competition is open to Sri Lankan School students under 19 years of age and the top four entrants are selected for participation in the International Earth Science Olympiad. The national competition is administered by a special committee appointed by the Executive Committee of the GSSL headed by the President-Elect of GSSL with other members being Secretary of GSSL, present and past National Coordinators of Earth Science Olympiad competition.

== Workshops on "Earth Science for Schools" ==
The GSSL hosts regular workshops. Since 1996 the Society has been running the "Earth Science For Schools" workshop for teachers, which has run in all provinces of the country. In 2013, the Society conducted a landmark workshop of Earth Science for Schools for school teachers of the northern province, with collaboration of the provincial and zonal education authorities in Jaffna city. This workshop was highly commended by the school teachers of Jaffna and other districts of the northern province of Sri Lanka.The 2017 Earth Science For Schools workshop was held in collaboration with Education Department of the North Western Province and was attended by over 50 teachers over two days and was the 28th such workshop. The GSSL continues to conduct similar workshops for school teachers islandwide, as a volunteer campaign to disseminate knowledge of the geological sciences in the country.

== Publications ==
The Journal of the Geological Society of Sri Lanka is a peer-reviewed journal, published annually. Articles on all aspects of Earth Science/Geology, with most contributions from Sri Lanka, and a few from other countries are published in the journal.

== Annual Technical Sessions ==
Many researchers present their findings in the Annual Technical Sessions of the Society, held in February each year since the inception of the GSSL in 1983. The abstracts of presented papers are published in a volume of proceedings. Annually, around 50 papers are presented and the event is graced by highly qualified academics/professionals and university Chancellors, Deans and Heads of departments. The abstracts of presented papers are published in a volume of proceedings. The Annual technical Session day is the most cheerful day for the member geologists who gather from every corners of Sri Lanka to enlighten their knowledge as well as to strengthen the friendships.

== See also ==
- Geological Society of London
- Geological Society of India
