= Albanian Geological Survey =

Government agency of Albania

- Shërbimi Gjeologjik Shqiptar
- Official logo

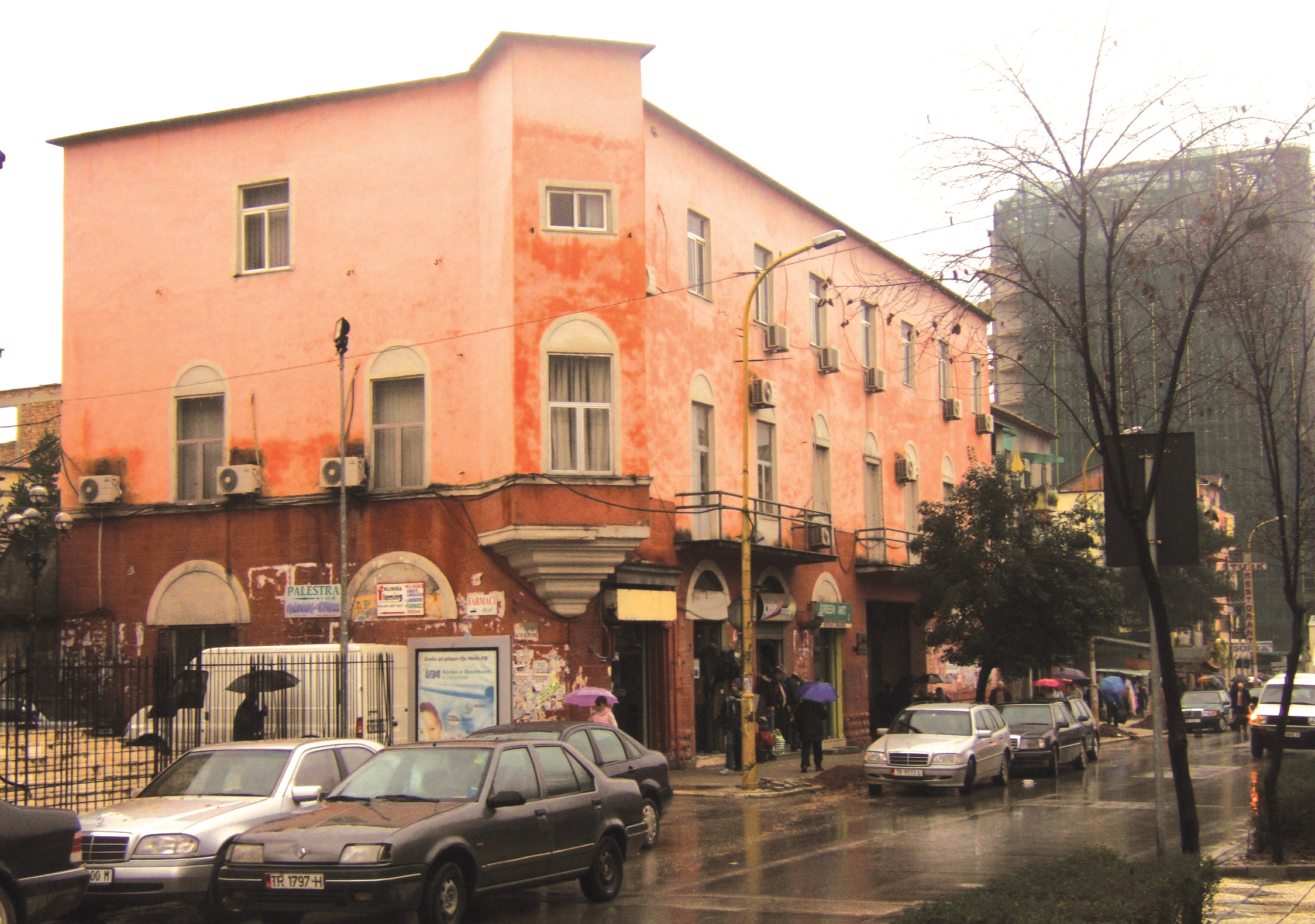
- Headquarters of SHGJSH in Tirana

Government agency overview
- Formed: 31 August 1952
- Jurisdiction: Albania
- Headquarters: Tirana
- Government agency executive: Adrian Bylyku
- Website: gsa.gov.al

The Albanian Geological Survey (Albanian: Shërbimi Gjeologjik Shqiptar – SHGJSH) is an advisory institution of the Albanian Government which carries out its activities in the field of land sciences throughout the territory of Albania.

This institution dates back to 1922, when a geological office was established at the Ministry of Agriculture and Public Works under the direction of head geologist Dr. Ernst Nowack, an Austrian (Bohemian-born) geologist. After seven years of activity, the office was no longer documented in official records. Its activities resumed in 1952 when the Albanian Geological Survey was formed.

== Structure ==
AGS is organized into the following departments:

- Department of Geology
- Department of Mineral Resources
- Department of Hydrogeology
- Department of Hydrocarbons
- Department of Geoengineering and Geophysics
- Department of Marine Geology
- Department of Geoinformatization
- Department of Development and Programming
- Department of Analytical Laboratory
- Department of Finance and Support Services

== Directors ==
No.	Name	Term in office
1	Zihni Sinoimeri	1952	1955
2	Zenel Hamiti	1955	1957
3	Xhafer Spahiu	1957	1959
4	Zenel Hamiti	1960	1965
5	Teki Biçoku	1965	1974
6	Ramadan Vladi	1974	1982
7	Haki Caslli	1982	1987
8	Halil Hallaçi	1987	1989
9	Pajtim Bello	1989	1989
10	Ndoc Uci	1989	1991
11	Vasil Grillo	1991	1997
12	Mehmet Zaçaj	1997	2001
13	Hamdi Beshku	2001	2006
14	Adil Neziraj	2006	2013
15	Halim Dariu	2013	2013
16	Viktor Doda	2013	2023
17	Dhori Dapi	2023	2023
18	Adrian Bylyku	2023	ongoing
