= Mineral Core Research Facility =

Canadian research institute

Coordinates: 53.5032°N 113.4129°W

The Mineral Core Research Facility (MCRF), run by the Alberta Geological Survey (AGS), assists the Alberta government's Department of Energy in administering the Metallic and Industrial Minerals Regulations of the Mines and Minerals Act for the Province of Alberta. Under these regulations, the Crown collects mineral core and rock samples from companies working on mineral permits and makes these materials publicly available for use by prospectors, mineral exploration companies and academia for mineral exploration and research purposes.

The MCRF is a large warehouse complex for core storage with two viewing/display areas and a visitors office. The facility is 1235 square metres plus 310 square metres on the mezzanine, located in the Capital Industrial Park of Edmonton, Alberta. The MCRF contains more than 58,572 metres of mineral core and 17,000 rock samples, primarily from the exposed Canadian Shield in northeast Alberta.

== History ==
A diamond drillcore selection and storage program was started by the Alberta Energy and Natural Resources Department in 1979. The submission of core drilled during exploration for metallic or industrial minerals is required by the Metallic and Industrial Mineral Regulations, as part of the exploration approval process.

Alberta Geological Survey was contracted to prepare a facility to store and manage the core and to select core and samples on behalf of the Alberta Energy. The original facility was called the Mineral Exploration Core and Sample Storage. In the early 1980s, a research component was added to the function and the facility named was changed to the Mineral Core Research Facility (MCRF).

In 1995, the activity ceased as a contracted function and became an integrated activity of the Mineral Agreements Branch and AGS.

== Activities ==
Mineral core and rock samples are collected by AGS geologists and exploration companies and sent to the MCRF. The core is catalogued, stored and available for logging or sampling by the public, industry or scientific community.

== Mineral assessment reports ==
Assessment reports are the record of geological, geochemical, geophysical and other exploration work completed on mineral claims (exploration permits). Assessment reports are useful to subsequent property holders because they provide information that can be used to advance the prospect, rather than duplicating work already done by a previous mineral rights holder. Due to regulations, assessment reports remain confidential for one year after submission. AGS has 675 assessment reports on file, dating from 1949 to 2002. All non-confidential reports are available for viewing.
