= The Chamber of Geophysical Engineers of Turkey =

Turkish nonprofit organization

The Chamber of Geophysical Engineers of Turkey Jeofizik Muhendisleri Odasi
- Abbreviation: JFMO
- Formation: 1986
- Type: NGO
- Purpose: Professional
- Headquarters: Ankara, Turkey
- Members: Chambers of Engineers and Architects
- President: ŞEVKET DEMİRBAŞ
- Website: www.jeofizik.org.tr

The Chamber of Geophysical Engineers of Turkey (CGET) is a nonprofit organization found in 1986 and promotes the expert and ethical practice of geophysics in the exploration and development of natural resources, in characterizing the near-surface, and in mitigating earth hazards. While most CGET members are involved in engineering problems and groundwater explorations, CGET members also are involved in application of geophysics methods to mineral and petroleum explorations, archaeological researches, seismology and other scientific activities.

== History of CGET ==
Although initial academic studies started as early as 1926, Geophysics education started in 1952 in the Istanbul University and Turkish geophysicists gathered under the association of the mining engineers of the Turkey. Later, with the inspiration of SEG, the Geophysical Society of Turkey was found in 1961. The society survived till 1980 and ceased its activities due to military coup for six years. Then, CGET was established in 1986, as a member of the Union of Chambers of Turkish Engineers and Architects.

== Membership ==
SEG memberships open to graduates from geophysics departments. All members receive the all journals and newsletters free and attend to all scientific meetings with modest fee

== Meetings and events ==
CGET has hosted meetings, conferences, workshops, and expositions for the geosciences community since its very early days. These national and international events have taken place in numerous locations including abroad. CGET was the first Corporate Member of the EAEG and an Affiliate of the EAGE (European Association of Geoscientists and Engineers) having representatives in the councils of both associations before the merger of the two into EAGE. Recently our Chamber became a section of the SEG (Society of Exploration of Geophysicists). CGET has also established close relations with the geophysicists from many Balkan States, East European and CIS countries

== Students and CGET ==
CGET motivates the students join the chamber. Student members also receive the all journals and newsletters free and attend to all scientific meetings and purchase the books with reduced fee.

== Journals, books, and newsletters ==
“Jeofizik” is a peer-reviewed journal and has been published biannually since late fifties. It is covering all aspects of research, exploration, and education in geophysics. “Jeofizik Bulteni” is a newsletter and shares news, non-technical information as well as achievements of the members. CGET has published books including genuine research notes, translations and special issues.

== Executives ==
The presidents of the CGET have been (election periods);

Mehmet B. Ateş (1986-1990)

Osman Demirağ (1990-2000)

Ö Ahmet Ercan (2000-2001)

İbrahim Aydın (2001-2002)

A. Uğur Gönülalan (2002-2008)

Şevket Demirbaş (2008-2010)

Metin Altay (2010-2012)

Şevket Demirbaş (2012-2016)
