= South Wales Geologists' Association =

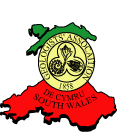
- Formation: 1960
- Website: www.swga.org.uk

The South Wales Geologists' Association (SWGA) is an affiliated local group of the Geologists' Association. It was founded in 1960 (Douglas Bassett and T. R. Owen being amongst the co-founders) and registered as a charity in 1996 (no. 1054303).

== Activities ==
The SWGA's aims are the study and promotion of geology in South Wales. Anyone with an interest in geology and the earth sciences is welcome, professional or amateur. Activities include field trips during the summer season, and lectures at Swansea or Cardiff University's geology departments during the winter season, as well as support for Rockwatch activities for young people and geological events for the public.

In addition, the South Wales Geologists' Association maintains close links with like-minded organisations such as the Pembrokeshire Coast National Park Authority, the Fforest Fawr Geopark, the Southern Wales regional group of the Geological Society, the Wales & West branch of the Russell Society, and the Cardiff Naturalists' Society.

The SWGA is also supportive of initiatives in geoconservation and geodiversity, in particular through their involvement in the creation of the South East Wales RIGS group.

== Past chairmen and presidents ==
The group was headed by a chairman during the period 1959–1996, and by a president from 1996 onwards.

=== Past chairmen ===
Source : Group of Chairmen 1959–1992, from "GEOLOGISTS’ ASSOCIATION, SOUTH WALES GROUP, A GEOLOGICAL PERSPECTIVE 1960–1992", p. 24–25, Compiled by ALUN J. THOMAS, supplemented from SWGA archives and minutes.

Chairman	Period
Douglas A. Bassett	1959–1962
David E. Morgan	1962–1964
David J. W. Thomas	1964–1966
T. Richard Owen	1966–1968
John C. W. Baker	1968–1970
Trevor M. Thomas	1970–1972
Michael Brooks	1972–1974
D. Emlyn Evans	1974–1976
Rodney A. Gayer	1976–1978
Derek V. Ager	1978–1980
John W. Perkins	1980–1982
John C. W. Cope	1982–1984
Alan G. Thomas	1984–1986
Anthony T. S. Ramsay	1986–1988
R. Alan Stephens	1988–1990
Alun J. Thomas	1990–1992
Michael G. Bassett	1992–1994
Peter Hodges	1994–1996

=== Past presidents ===
President	Period
Lynda Garfield	1996–1998
W. R. Gareth Davies	1998–2000
Steven G. Howe	2000–2002
Allan Cuthbertson	2002–2004
Lynfa Lewis	2004–2006
Tom Sharpe	2006–2008
Nigel McGaw	2008–2010
Malcolm Shaw	2010–2012
Geraint Owen	2012–2014
Rhian Kendall	2014–2016
John Davies	2016–2018
Lesley Cherns	2018–2020
Christopher Lee	2020-2022
John Nudds	2022-2024
Chris Berry	2024-2026
Cindy Howells	2026-

== Publications ==
Publications cater for a range of geological ability and include field guides, geological booklets and guided walks leaflets to areas of interest in South Wales. Amongst them are:

- Michael G. Bassett 1982 (ISBN 0720002494) Geological excursions in Dyfed, south-west Wales
- Howe, S., Owen, G. & Sharpe, T. 2005 (ISBN 0903222019) Walking the Rocks
- Dilys Harlow 2014 (ISBN 0903222027) The Land of the Beacons Way: Scenery and Geology Across the Brecon Beacons National Park

== See also ==
- Geologists' Association
- Rockwatch
