= Douglas Bassett (geologist) =

Welsh geologist (1927–2009)

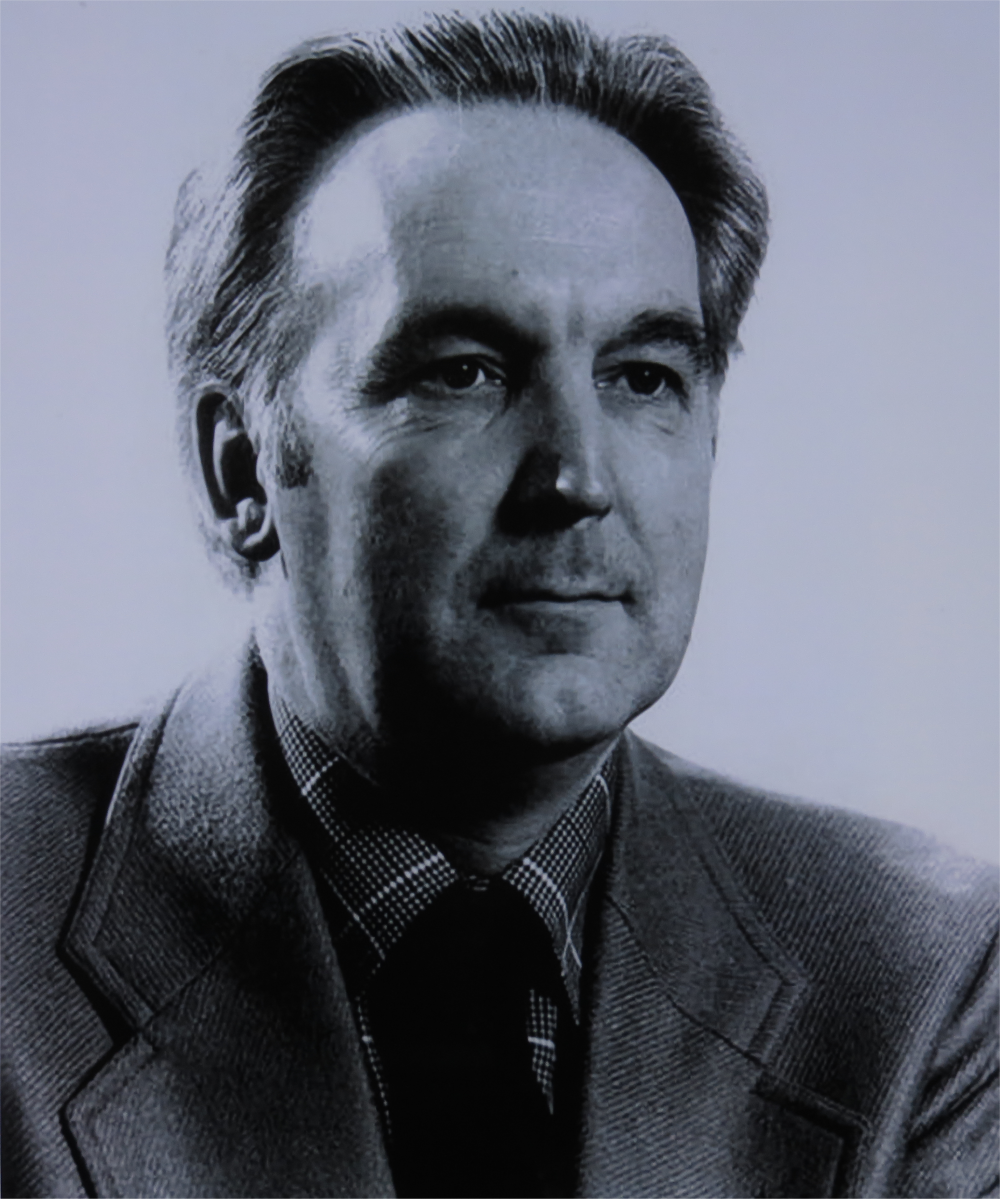
- Born: 11 August 1927
- Died: 8 November 2009 (aged 82)
- Occupation: Geologist
- Known for: Director of the National Museum of Wales

Douglas Anthony Bassett (11 August 1927 – 8 November 2009) was a Welsh geologist and a director of the National Museum of Wales from 1977 to 1985.

Bassett was born in Llwynhendy, near Llanelli, in industrial Carmarthenshire as the son of a coal miner. He took a degree in Geology at Aberystwyth University in 1952, and after obtaining his doctorate in the same discipline, lectured in Geology at Glasgow University from 1952 to 1959. Having joined the National Museum of Wales as keeper of Geology in 1959, he was appointed in the role of Director in 1977 until 1985, when ill-health forced him to retire.

== Career ==
From 1952 to 1959, Bassett taught in the Geology Department at Glasgow University and at the same time studied the geology of north and mid-Wales, especially the Bala district, in collaboration with Alwyn Williams and Harry Whittington, and his pioneering surveys came to be considered models of their kind.

His years at the National Museum of Wales saw a rapid growth of the Museum's Geology Department. He encouraged colleagues and students working in Wales to donate their specimen collections and developed the Museum as a centre for research, especially in the Natural Sciences. In 1960 he co-founded the South Wales Group of the Geologists' Association which flourishes to this day.

In 1961, he published Bibliography and Index of Geology and Allied Sciences for Wales and the Welsh Borders 1897–1958, which made his name as a geologist, followed six years later by A Source-book of Geological, Geomorphological and Soil Maps for Wales and the Welsh Borders 1800–1966, which proved invaluable for town and country planners.

Various public bodies benefited from his expertise, amongst them the Welsh Office, the Ordnance Survey and the Nature Conservancy Council. He was also a founder member of the National Welsh-American Foundation, of which he was the Vice-President between 1996 and 1998.

== Awards ==
Bassett received the Aberconway Medal from the Institute of Geologists and the Silver Medal of the Czechoslovak Society for International Relations in 1985. He also was made Officier de l'Ordre des Arts et des Lettres by the Ministry of Culture in Paris in recognition of the National Museum's loan of its collection of Impressionist paintings for exhibition at various venues in France. He was made an honorary professorial fellow at the University of Wales College of Cardiff (1977–97), and a member of the White Robe Order of the Gorsedd of Bards (Wales' equivalent of a CBE).

== Publications ==
- Bibliography and Index of Geology and Allied Sciences for Wales and the Welsh Borders 1897–1958 (National Museum of Wales, 1961).
- A source-book of geological, geomorphological and soilmaps for Wales and the Welsh Borders (1800–1966) (National Museum of Wales, 1967).
