= Faculty of Earth Sciences, King Abdulaziz University =

Faculty of Earth Sciences (FES) is a specialized geology college in the Middle East. It was founded in the beginning as the Applied Geological Center belonging to the Ministry of Petroleum and Mineral Resources of Saudi Arabia. Later it became one of the King Abdulaziz University schools. The faculty currently has seven geoscience departments:

1. Mineral Resources & Rocks
2. Petroleum Geology & Sedimentation
3. Hydrology
4. Geophysics
5. Structural Geology & Remote Sensing
6. Engineering & Environmental Geology
7. Technical Training Department (offer diploma only)

The FES offers programs leading to a Bachelor of Science (B.S.), Master of Science (M.S.) and Doctor of Philosophy (Ph.D.) degree in most departments mentioned above. The Faculty presently includes 65 full-time faculty members and professors and 23 labs.
