= Pacific Section =

Logo for PSAAPG

The Pacific Section of the American Association of Petroleum Geologists, or PSAAPG, is a non-profit geological society whose members are interested in the geology of the West Coast of the United States. Originally founded in 1924 as the Pacific Society of Petroleum Geologists, this organization today is one of the regional divisions of the American Association of Petroleum Geologists (AAPG). Although mainly geologists associated with the petroleum industry join the society, its membership also includes environmental geologists, educators, geophysicists and engineers who find membership in the organization benefits their personal interests and/or careers.

== Affiliated societies ==
The Pacific Section is affiliated with several smaller geologic organizations, and the Pacific Section in most cases functions as a liaison between these societies and the parent organization of the AAPG.

- Alaska Geological Society
- Coast Geological Society
- Los Angeles Basin Geological Society
- Northern California Geological Society
- Northwest Energy Association
- Sacramento Petroleum Association (no website)
- San Joaquin Geological Society
