= Institute on Lake Superior Geology =

Non-profit geological society

- Abbreviation: ILSG
- Formation: 1955
- Headquarters: Duluth, Minnesota
- Location: United States
- Website: www.lakesuperiorgeology.org

The Institute on Lake Superior Geology (ILSG) is a non-profit professional society that was founded in 1955 with the goal of providing a forum for exchange of geological ideas and scientific data and promoting better understanding of the geology of the Lake Superior region, which includes areas in the states of Michigan, Minnesota and Wisconsin in the US and Ontario in Canada. The major activity of the institute is an annual meeting with geological field trips and technical presentations.

In addition to running an annual meeting, the ILSG actively supports student research through the Doug Duskin Student Paper awards and acknowledges the outstanding work of scientists through the Goldich medal which is presented in acknowledgement of outstanding contributions to the geology of the region.

As well as publishing field guides to the geology of the Lake Superior region, the ILSG provides a central resource for highlighting the research undertaken in the area.
