= Rockwatch =

Rockwatch is the junior club of the Geologists' Association, established in November 2001. Although it operates under the auspices of the Geologists' Association, it functions independently from the parent body.

== Magazine ==
Rockwatch publishes a full colour magazine three times a year. Each issue is full of geological articles, many of them cutting-edge science, as well as activities and puzzles.

== Field trips ==
Field trips take place throughout the UK, and give members the chance to meet eminent geologists, as well as collect fossils and minerals. Parents/guardians are required to accompany their children.

== See also ==
- Geologists' Association
- South Wales Geologists' Association
