= Pittsburgh Geological Society =

The Pittsburgh Geological Society, more familiarly known as the PGS, was founded in 1945. Its purpose is to serve the professional interest of the society's membership.

== History ==
In the forties, the membership was mainly interested in petroleum technology, and affiliation with the American Association of Petroleum Geologists (AAPG) came a few years later. Early meetings were held in downtown Pittsburgh and Oakland. The membership quickly showed the oil and gas industry an ability to produce superior geological publications. This capability has continued to the present time.

Dinner meetings in the fifties through seventies generally featured topics of interest to the oil and gas community. The emphasis on oil and gas has changed to a broad range of geologically related subjects including environmental, geo-technical, and coal/mineral resources. The speakers at these meetings have been top quality. This has enabled the society to attract professionals from a broad range of interests.

== Presidents ==
Society presidents have been elected from a broad cross-section of the community. They include: oil and gas personnel, university professors, State Survey geologists, consultants, Army engineers, representatives from coal, refractory and steel companies, and interested others.

== Current activities ==
Meetings of the society give individuals an opportunity to hear many diverse subjects and to meet people interested in geologically related subjects. The dinner hour offers the chance to discuss problems and become acquainted with other professionals. The current meeting location is the Terrace Room in the Parkway Center (Greentree).

The PGS monthly newsletter has been the backbone of the Society. The editors present a brief abstract of the next meeting, along with a calendar of coming events and timely notes of general interest. PGS sponsors one-day field trips that broaden the understanding of local geological conditions. The Society also sponsors short courses, science fair judging, awards, and joint meetings with other area societies. The Society has maintained high standards in all these endeavors, because the membership has given many hours of their time and talents to the Society.

== See also ==
- Pittsburgh Association of Petroleum Geologists
