= Centre for Earthquake Studies =

Research institute in Pakistan

Coordinates: 33°44′N 73°09′E

- مرکز برائے تحقیق و مطالعہِ زلزلہ
- Established: 8 October 2005; 20 years ago
- Research type: Scientific research and education on natural vibration and seismology
- Budget: Federally funded
- Field of research: Fundamental science (Geophysics, supercomputing, geoscience)
- Director: Prof. Dr. Muhammad Ali Shah
- Emeritus scientist: Ahsan Mubarak; Qasim Jan
- Location: Islamabad, Pakistan
- Operating agency: Quaid-e-Azam University
- Website: www.ncp.edu/ces.php

The Centre for Earthquake Studies (CES) (Urdu: مرکز برائے تحقیق و مطالعہِ زلزلہ) is a federally funded research institute and national laboratory dedicated to the advancement in understanding of natural vibration, seismology, and artificial yield-based energy measurement of seismic waves.

The CES was established through federal funding as a direct response to, and on the same day as, the devastating 2005 Kashmir earthquake in order to understand earthquakes and provide scientific prediction of quakes to improve earthquake preparedness. The CES is the only national site in Pakistan working on earthquake precursors.

The national laboratory is headquartered in the campus area of the National Centre for Physics (NCP) and conducts mathematical research in earth sciences, in close coordination with the NCP.

== History ==
The national site was founded by the Government of Pakistan on the advice of the science adviser Dr. Ishfaq Ahmad. The establishment of the national site came in response to Pakistan's deadliest earthquake, the 2005 Kashmir earthquake on 8 October 2005. Initially created as the Earthquake Studies Department at the National Centre for Physics, it gained independence shortly after its establishment. The CES undertakes research studies in the development of expertise in anomalous geophysical phenomenon prior to seismic activity. The CES primarily produces its research outcomes by using computer simulation and mathematical modelling to interpret seismic activity and give earthquake predictions.

The CES's campus also includes the various ATROPATENA stations network, and supports its research and development with close collaboration with the Global Network for the Forecasting of Earthquakes. Its first and founding director was Dr. Ahsan Mubarak who is still designated as the CES's senior scientist. Currently, Dr. Muhammad Qaisar is the CES's current administrator.

== Galleries ==
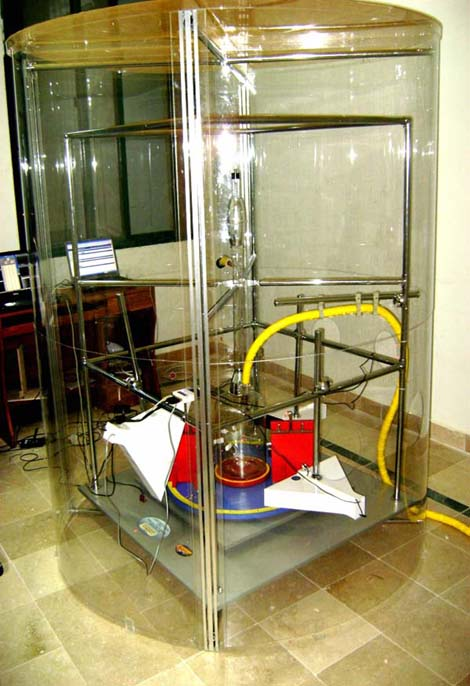
International Station for the Forecasting of Earthquakes ATROPATENA-PK (Pakistan)

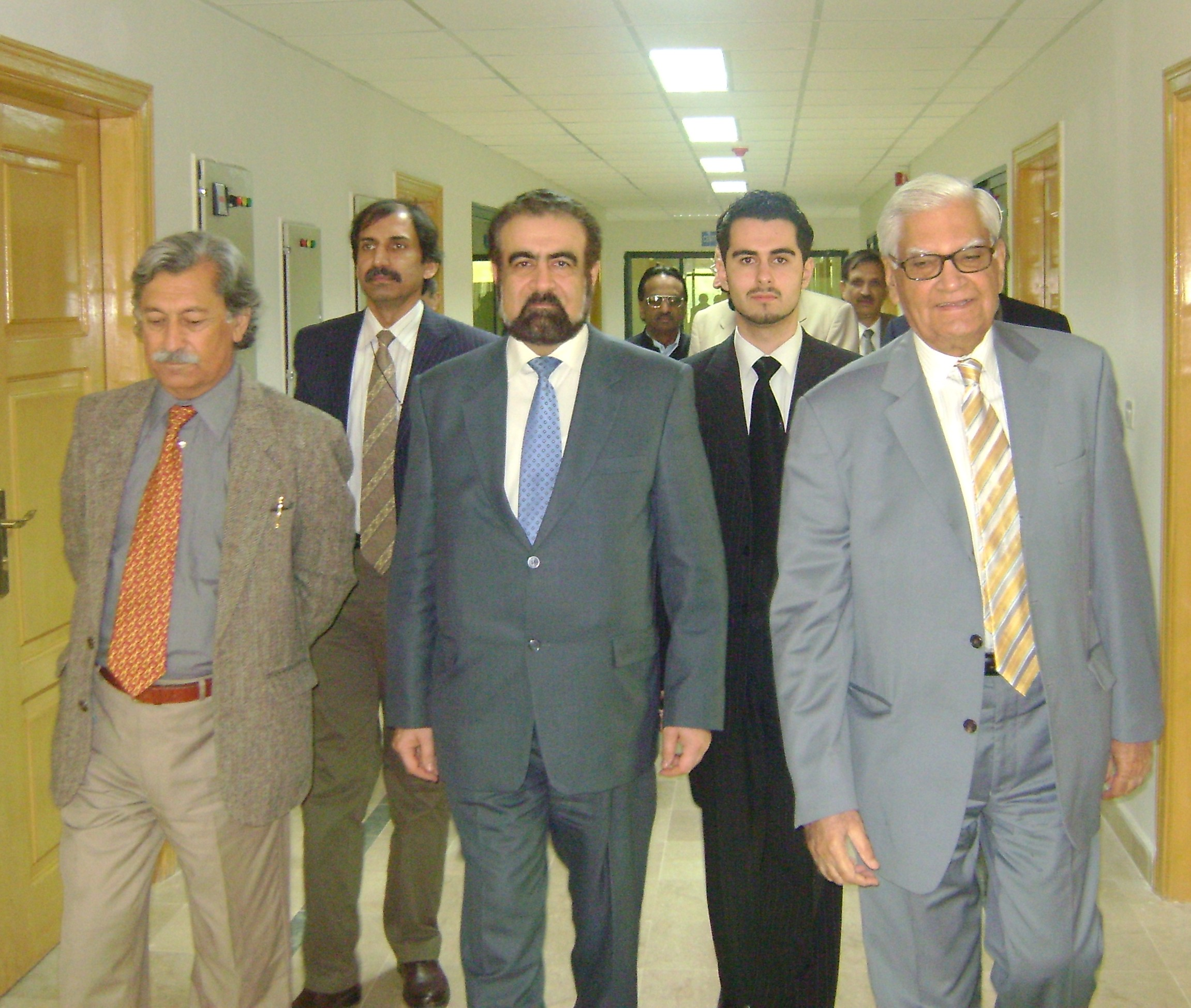
Dr. Ishfaq Ahmad, Dr. Elchin Khalilov and Dr. M. Qasim Jan meeting at the CES in February 2009.

== See also ==
- 2005 Pakistan earthquake

== Official links ==
- Official website
