= Arizona Geological Society =

Non-profit scientific organization

- Formation: 1948
- Type: Society
- Headquarters: Tucson, Arizona
- Members: 346
- Official language: English
- President: Alison Jones (2013)
- Website: www.arizonageologicsoc.org

The Arizona Geological Society (AGS) is a non-profit scientific organization founded in 1948 whose purpose is to promote and encourage interest in the science of geology and in the geology of the State of Arizona. The Society holds monthly meetings, and sponsors field trips and symposia. Membership is open to professional geoscientists and those who are interested in Arizona geology. Membership categories include Voting Members, Student Members, Honorary Life Members, and 50-Year Members.

Honorary Life Members include: Spencer R. Titley (1996), John M. Guilbert (1998), Walter E. Heinrichs Jr. (2008), Donald Hammer (April 2009), and Corolla Hoag (2010).
Institutional members includes the current Director of the Arizona Geological Survey in Tucson.

AGS Maps, Digests, and Guidebooks are published at irregular intervals.

== Governance ==
The society is managed by a 15-member executive committee consisting of officers and advisory councilors who serve calendar-year terms. The officers include president, vice president-field trips, vice president-programs, vice president-marketing, secretary, vice-secretary, treasurer, and vice-treasurer; their duties are specified in the bylaws of the society. The advisory council consists of six members who serve staggered three-year terms; their duties are to promote interest in AGS activities and supervise special projects undertaken by the society. The seventh member of the advisory council is the immediate past-president who serves as chair of the advisory committee. The executive committee serves without remuneration.

There are three other committees nominated by the executive committee to perform specific duties. These include the investment committee, the J. Harold Courtright Scholarship Committee, and the Nominating Committee.

- The Investment Committee is the financial advisor to the executive committee and operates under guidance specified in the AGS "Mission, Financial Management and Investment Policy."
- The J. Harold Courtright Committee solicits applications from qualified graduate students who are researching field geology projects in the Northern and Southern Cordillera with emphasis on the study of ore deposits; this committee awards a scholarship annually in honor of former AGS member and ASARCO exploration geologist J. Harold Courtright (1908–1986).
- The Nominating Committee is chaired by the immediate Past-President who, along with 2–4 other voting members of AGS, prepares the proposed slate of incoming Officers and Councilors to be approved by the executive committee and presented to the membership in the election held in September. The J. Harold Courtright and Nominating Committees are disbanded after their duties are performed.

== AGS Maps, Digests, and Guidebooks ==
Arizona Geological Society has prepared two Arizona geologic highway maps, one of which is still in print. The 1998 highway map was prepared in collaboration with the Arizona Geological Survey.

AGS Digests are a serial geologic publication produced on an irregular basis usually as a compilation of papers presented at a scientific symposium. The first Digest was produced in 1952; the most recent was Digest 22 published in 2008. The Digests have International Standard Serial Number ISSN 0066-7412

Over the decades, AGS field trips have visited every part of Arizona's varied landscape and geology. The trips are intended for professional geologists, and led by geologists with the United States Geological Survey, Arizona Geological Survey and other governmental agencies, the three major Arizona universities, mine geology departments at the producing mines, and by graduate students presenting their research topics and thesis or dissertation progress. For the Spring or Fall field trips, a formal guidebook is prepared.

== AGS Symposia ==
Historically AGS symposia have focused on the connections between the geology of ore deposits and structural geology with associated pre- and post-meeting field trips and a compendium of papers prepared after the meetings. They have traditionally been co-sponsored by the United States Geological Survey branch in Tucson, the University of Arizona, and/or other professional geological societies and organizations. A list of the past symposia include the:

- 1952 Field Trip Excursions held in connection with the Geological Society of America, Cordilleran Section 48th Annual Meeting, Tucson, (Guidebook I),
- 1959 Southern Arizona Field Conference held in connection with the Geological Society of America, Cordilleran Section 55th Annual Meeting, Tucson (Digest II combined with Guidebook II),
- 1978 Porphyry Copper Symposium held at the University of Arizona, Tucson (Digest XI),
- 1981 Symposium on Relations of Tectonics to Ore Deposits in the Southern Cordillera, University of Arizona, Tucson (Digest 14)
- 1986 Frontiers in Geology and Ore Deposits of Arizona and the Southwest, Tucson (Digest XVI),
- 1994 Bootprints Along the Cordillera: Porphyry Copper Deposits from Alaska to Chile co-sponsored by the Society for Mining, Metallurgy, and Exploration and the U.S. Geological Survey in Tucson (Digest 20), and the
- 2007 Ores and Orogenesis: Circum-Pacific Tectonics, Geologic Evolution, and Ore Deposits, co-sponsored by the 'United States Geological Survey', the Society for Mining, Metallurgy and Exploration, the Geological Society of Nevada, and the Society of Economic Geologists, Tucson (Digest 22). This symposium honored the career of William R. Dickinson.
