= Pittsburgh Association of Petroleum Geologists =

PAPGrocks.org

The Pittsburgh Association of Petroleum Geologists (PAPG) is an American non-profit organization that was founded in 1984 to provide a forum for petroleum geologists in the Pittsburgh area to meet socially and discuss technical topics relative to the exploration and development of reserves in the Northern and Central Appalachian Basin.

== History ==
PAPG is an affiliated association with AAPG (American Association of Petroleum Geologists) and has representation in the House of Delegates. Educational opportunities are provided via field trips, seminars and AAPG Sectional meetings, sponsored solely by PAPG or in conjunction with the PTTC (Petroleum Technology Transfer Council), PGS (Pittsburgh Geological Society) and SPE (Society of Petroleum Engineers).

Although PAPG is predominantly a geologic organization, numerous industry professionals including geophysicists, engineers, lawyers and landmen are among PAPG's members and find the interaction at meetings and educational opportunities beneficial to their professions. PAPG also encourages student membership and participation.

Meetings are typically held monthly from September through May in locations within fifty miles of downtown Pittsburgh. From time to time, meetings are held in conjunction with SPE and PGS.
