= Oxford Geology Group =

- Formation: 24 January 1957; 69 years ago
- Founder: J.M. Edmonds
- Founded at: Department of Earth Sciences, South Parks Road, Oxford, OX1 3AN
- Type: Charitable organization
- Registration no.: 1175367
- Headquarters: Department of Earth Sciences, South Parks Road, Oxford, OX1 3AN
- Members: 300
- Website: ogg.rocks

The Oxford Geology Group (commonly known as OGG). is an Oxfordshire-based society for geology and the wider Earth Sciences. Founded in 1957, the Group is closely associated to the University of Oxford’s Department of Earth Sciences and is a Registered Charity (No. 1175367). The Group runs a variety of activities including lecture series and colloquia, and geological field meetings. Its membership is broad and includes students, and both amateur and professional geologists.

== History ==
The Oxford Geology Group was founded in January 1957 in the Department of Geology and Mineralogy (now Department of Earth Sciences) at the University of Oxford by a group of academics and amateur geologists. The first president of the Group was Lawrence Wager, a professor of geology at the university.

== Activities ==
OGG holds two regular lecture series named after eminent Oxford geologists, the Buckland Lectures with an emphasis on applied and economic geology, and the Wager Lectures with a focus on academic geological research. Lectures are held at the Department of Earth Sciences. The Group holds an annual Oxford Colloquium, generally hosted at the Oxford Museum of Natural History or the Saïd Business School. The OGG field programme includes six annual 'georambles' (light thematic walks on local geology), as well as more intensive field meetings across the UK and abroad.

OGG also supports undergraduates in the Department of Earth Sciences through bursaries for fieldwork

== See also ==
- Lawrence Wager
- Michael Winterbottom (academic)
