= International Organization for Biological Crystallization =

- Abbreviation: IOBCr
- Formation: 2002, ICCBM-9, Jena
- Legal status: Scientific Organization
- Purpose: Promote interactions among scientists interested in the crystallization of biological molecules

The International Organization for Biological Crystallization (IOBCr) is a non-profit, scientific organization for scientists who study the crystallization of biological macromolecules and develop crystallographic methodologies for their study. It was founded in 2002 to create a permanent organ for the organization of the International Conferences for the crystallization of Biological Macromolecules (ICCBM). The ICCBM conferences are organized biannually with venues that change regularly to maintain an international character. The objective of the IOBCr is the exchange of research results and encourage practical applications of biological crystallization. It organizes and supports interdisciplinary workshops. The attendance at the ICCBM meetings includes bio-crystallographers, biochemists, physicists, and engineers.

== ICCBM meeting locations ==
- ICCBM18 Tempe, Arizona, USA, 3–9 November 2024, (Organiser: P. Fromme)
- ICCBM17 Shanghai, China, October 29 - November 2, 2018 (Organisers: Zhi-Jie Liu & Da-Chuan Yin)
- ICCBM16 Prague, Czech Republic, 2–7 July 2016 (Organiser: I Kutá Smatanová)
- ICCBM15 Hamburg, Germany, 17–20 September 2014 (Organisers: C. Betzel & J.R. Mesters)
- ICCBM14 Hunstville, Alabama, USA, 23–28 September 2012 (Organisers: J. Ng & M. Pusey)
- ICCBM13 Dublin, Ireland, 12–16 September 2010 (Organiser: M. Caffrey)
- ICCBM-12 Cancun, Mexico, 6–9 May 2008 (Organiser: A. Moreno)
- ICCBM-11 Quebec, Canada, 16–21 August 2006 (Organisers: S.-X. Lin)
- ICCBM-10 Beijing, China, 5–8 June 2004 (Organiser: Z. Rao)
- ICCBM-9 Jena, Germany, 23–28 March 2002 (Organiser: R. Hilgenfeld)
- ICCBM-8 Sandestin, Florida, USA, 14–19 May 2000 (Organisers: L. DeLucas, A. Chernov)
- ICCBM-7 Granada Spain, 3–8 May 1998 (Organiser: J. Garcia-Ruiz)
- ICCBM-6 Hiroshima, Japan, 12–17 November 1995 (Organisers: T. Ashida, H. Komatsu)
- ICCBM-5 San Diego, California, USA, 8–13 August 1993 (Organisers: E.A. Stura, J. Sowadski, E. Villafranca)
- ICCBM-4 Freiburg, Germany, 18–24 August 1991 (Organisers: J. Stezowski and W. Littke)
- ICCBM-3 Washington DC, USA, 13–19 August 1989 (Organiser: K Ward)
- ICCBM-2 Bischenberg, Strasbourg, France, 19–25 July 1987 (Organisers: R. Giege, A. Ducruix, J. Fontecilla-Camps)
- ICCBM-1 Stanford, California, USA, 14–16 August 1985 (Organiser: R. Feigelson)

== ICCBM Proceedings ==
- ICCBM-14 Crystal Growth & Design Volume vi, Issue 10, (September 2012)
- ICCBM-13 Crystal Growth & Design Volume vi, Issue 7, (September 2012)
- ICCBM-12 Crystal Growth & Design Volume 8, Issue 12, pp 4193–4193 (November 2008)
- ICCBM-11 Crystal Growth & Design Volume 7, Issue 11 Pages 2123–2371 (November 2007)
- ICCBM-10 Acta Crystallographica D Volume 61, Part 6 (June 2005)
- ICCBM-9 Acta Crystallographica D Volume 58, Part 10 (October 2002)
- ICCBM-8 Journal of Crystal Growth, Volume 232, Issues 1–4, Pages 1–647 (November 2001)
- ICCBM-7 Journal of Crystal Growth, Volume 196, Issue 2–4, (January 1999)
- ICCBM-6 Journal of Crystal Growth, Volume 168, Issues 1–4, Pages 1–328 (June 1996)
- ICCBM-5 Acta Crystallographica D Volume 50, Part 4 (July 1994)
- ICCBM-4 Journal of Crystal Growth, Volume 122, Issues 1–4, Pages 1–405 (August 1992)
- ICCBM-3 Journal of Crystal Growth, Volume 110, Issue 1–2, Pages 1–338 (March 1991)
- ICCBM-2 Journal of Crystal Growth, Volume 90, Issue 1–3, Pages 1–374 (May 1988)
- ICCBM-1 Journal of Crystal Growth, Volume 76, Issue 3, Pages 529–715 (May 1986)
