= Society of Mineral Museum Professionals =

Professional organization

The Society of Mineral Museum Professionals is a Tucson, Arizona-based professional organization of current and retired staff of accredited museums and universities in the curation of mineralogical, gemological and petrological collections.

The organization has produced monthly newsletters for its members since 1994.
