= Costa Rican Directorate of Geology and Mines =

Agency of the Costa Rican government

Directorate of Geology and Mines Dirección de Geología y Minas
- Abbreviation: DGM
- Legal status: Government organization
- Purpose: Geological survey
- Region served: Costa Rica
- Parent organization: Ministry of Environment, Energy and Telecommunications
- Website: www.geologia.go.cr

The Directorate of Geology and Mines (Spanish: Dirección de Geología y Minas) is an agency of the Costa Rican government. Its mission includes providing consulting services for mining and geoscience research.

The Directorate of Geology and Mines is a member of the Association of Geological and Mining in Latin America (ASGMI) and actively participates in their annual meetings, assuming the presidency of the association during the 2010-2011 and 2011–2012.

== Directors ==
- Marlene Salazar Alvarado
