= Kallak mine =

Proposed iron ore mine in northern Sweden

Kallak Iron Deposit
- Location within Sweden
- Location: Lapland, Jokkmokk, Sweden; 66°47′N 19°7′E
- Products: Iron ore
- Company: Beowulf Mining

The proposed Kallak mine is a controversial plan to exploit one of the largest unexploited iron ore deposits in Sweden.

== Background ==
The mining of iron ore in Sweden is a huge industry and is centred mainly in northern Sweden. The country holds 60% of Europe's identified iron ore deposits and is as of 2021 responsible for 90% of Europe's iron ore extraction and 5% of the world's reserves in 2014.

More than 96% of total ore production comes from the mines in the northern region, known as Norrland. Comprising 10 of the 12 active mines in the country, these mines lie in Sápmi (historically "Lapland"), the traditional territory of the Sámi, the only Indigenous people in Scandinavia.

== Location and community ==
The proposed site of a new mine known as Kallak (the Swedish form of Gállak, the original name of the place in the Lule Sámi language, derived from the Sámi family name Gállak which is a lineage of Sámis that gave name to many places in Sarek such as Gállakjávrre and Gállakvárre. The name has later been wrongfully distorted into Gállok) is located on an island in the hydropower-regulated Little Lule River between the (non-Sámi) villages of Björkholmen and Randijaur in the municipality of Jokkmokk in the province of Norrbotten in northern Sweden. It is located near the hydropower plant Parki, and the regulation reservoirs Parkijaure and Randijaure. Björkholmen and Randijaur have around 100 inhabitants, constituting the permanent residents of Gállok/Kallak.

The site is on the ancestral lands of the indigenous Sámi people and forms part of the reindeer winter grazing lands of the Sámi community of Jåhkågaska tjiellde. The community consists of approximately one hundred members, of which around half work directly with reindeer herding. While this is the community primarily affected by the mining proposal, two other neighbouring Sámi communities would also be indirectly affected.

== Mining exploration ==
The Kallak north and Kallak south prospects were identified by the Geological Survey of Sweden in the 1940s. In the late 1960s the SGU identified Kallak north as containing 92 million tonnes of ore and Kallak south as containing 29 million tonnes of ore at a grade of roughly 35%.

Beowulf Mining acquired the Kallak north licence in 2006, and a drill program conducted in 2010 has found at least 175 Mt of Iron at an average grade of 30%. Beowulf acquired the Kallak south licence from Tasman Metals in mid-2010. An ongoing drill program has shown Kallak south to contain at least 400 million tonnes of Iron at an average grade of 30%.

The combined Kallak deposit contains at least 600 million tonnes of Iron and it is believed that the north and south deposits are connected at depth to give a single iron deposit with a strike length of over 4 km (2.5 mi).

In mid-2010 an independent conceptual study performed by the Raw Materials Group showed that the Kallak north deposit, which at the time was thought to contain 150 million tonnes of iron at 30% grading, was commercially viable.

In 2011 the Swedish companys Beowulf Mining Sweden AB and Jokkmokk Iron Mines AB have been registered. All companies are connected to Beowulf Mining plc. Jokkmokk Iron Mines AB is a wholly owned subsidiary of Beowulf Mining plc.

In March 2022 Swedish journalists revealed that Beowulf Mining is linked to tax savings in British Virgin Islands and is unlikely to provide the promised 1 billion SEK extra tax revenue in 25 years to Jokmokk municipality.

In September 2023 the exit of three key people of Beowulf Mining and a strategic review of this main project has been reported. An Affärsvärlden analyst explains the owners of Beowulf Mining and the lacks of funding the expected 5 billion SEK.

In September 2024 the company Jokkmokk Iron Mines AB published a consultation paper describing the planned operations and its main environmental impacts of the planned mining. An English version has been published on the Beowulf Mining website. This consultation paper gives the company's view and mentions a number of potential impacts of the proposed mining project. These include impacts on the landscape, noise, vibrations, air quality, groundwater, surface water, reindeer husbandry, natural environment, cultural environment, conservation of natural resources, communications, outdoor recreation, hunting and fishing, powerlines, total defence, hydropower, and the World Heritage Site Laponia.

According to the local visitors of the public consultation held by the company on 15 October 2024 in Jokkmokk there were general but no specific information on the project. According to the company the application for the environmental permit is planned for spring 2025.

== Impact and resistance ==
The plans to establish a mine at the site have met resistance from the indigenous Sámi people as well as other local inhabitants and have also raised concerns in regard to dam safety, within the hydro power regulated Lule River. On 1 July 2013, protesters set up a road blockade in order to prevent test drilling. On 30 July, the blockade was dismantled by the police, but on the next day the blockade was set up again.

Dam safety research points at the problems of combining hydro power with tailing dams, within the same system. In Sweden this would be the first time such a combination is made, and thereby this would be a full-scale experiment with major risks for people and drinking water provision downstream, amongst other the cities of Boden and Luleå.

In 2014, Norrbotten County said no to further mining in Kallak; the case would be closed if the Swedish governmental geology decision-making body Bergsstaten had agreed with Norrbotten County. However, Bergsstaten overruled the county and it was up to the government of Sweden to give a final answer to the question.

In summer 2019 over 1000 people got together in a Rainbow Gathering tent camp in Kallak in solidarity with the Sámi people.

In February 2020, the Swedish Government finally refused their application. However Beowulf has continued to express an interest in mining at Kallak. In December 2021, the new Prime Minister of Sweden, Magdalena Andersson, said that Sweden needed more mines, and shares rose in Beowulf after this announcement. With Swedish Green Party, which opposed the project, no longer in the governing coalition, the issue of allowance for the mining project reopened. In February 2022 advisors of the U.N. Human Rights Council and local Saami population protested against it together with Greta Thunberg. On 2 February 2022, the Sámi Parliament of Sweden submitted its opinion concerning a new mine in Kallak to the Ministry of Enterprise and Innovation (Sweden).

Despite the protests, on 22 March 2022, the Swedish Ministry of Enterprise, Energy and Communications, under a set of environmental protection-related conditions, gave a permission to Beowulf to proceed with the mining project. Before the mine is established, the project needs to be approved by the Swedish environmental court.

In September 2022 The Greta Thunberg Foundation donated SEK 2,000,000 (~ EUR 184,000) to the indigenous Jåhkåganska Sámi community in Jokkmokk municipality to support the Sámi communities legal fight against the Swedish government's decision to allow an iron mine in Gállok/Kallak.

The UNESCO World Heritage Committee has examined a report of the Swedish National Heritage Board and requests the authority to provide an updated report on the state of conservation of the World Heritage Laponia and the implementation of recommendations by 1 February 2025.

== See also ==
- Alta controversy – Protests in Finnmark, Norway
- Environmental racism in Europe – Exposure of groups to environmental harms
- Malmberget mine – Iron ore mine in northern Sweden
- Ruoutevare mine – Mine in Sweden
- Kaunisvaara mine – Mine in Pajala Municipality, Norrbotten County, Sweden
- Kiruna mine – Underground iron ore mine in Sweden
- Mertainen – Iron mine in Lapland, Sweden
- Beowulf Mining – Exploration and development company
