= Kaunisvaara mine =

Mine in Pajala Municipality, Norrbotten County, Sweden

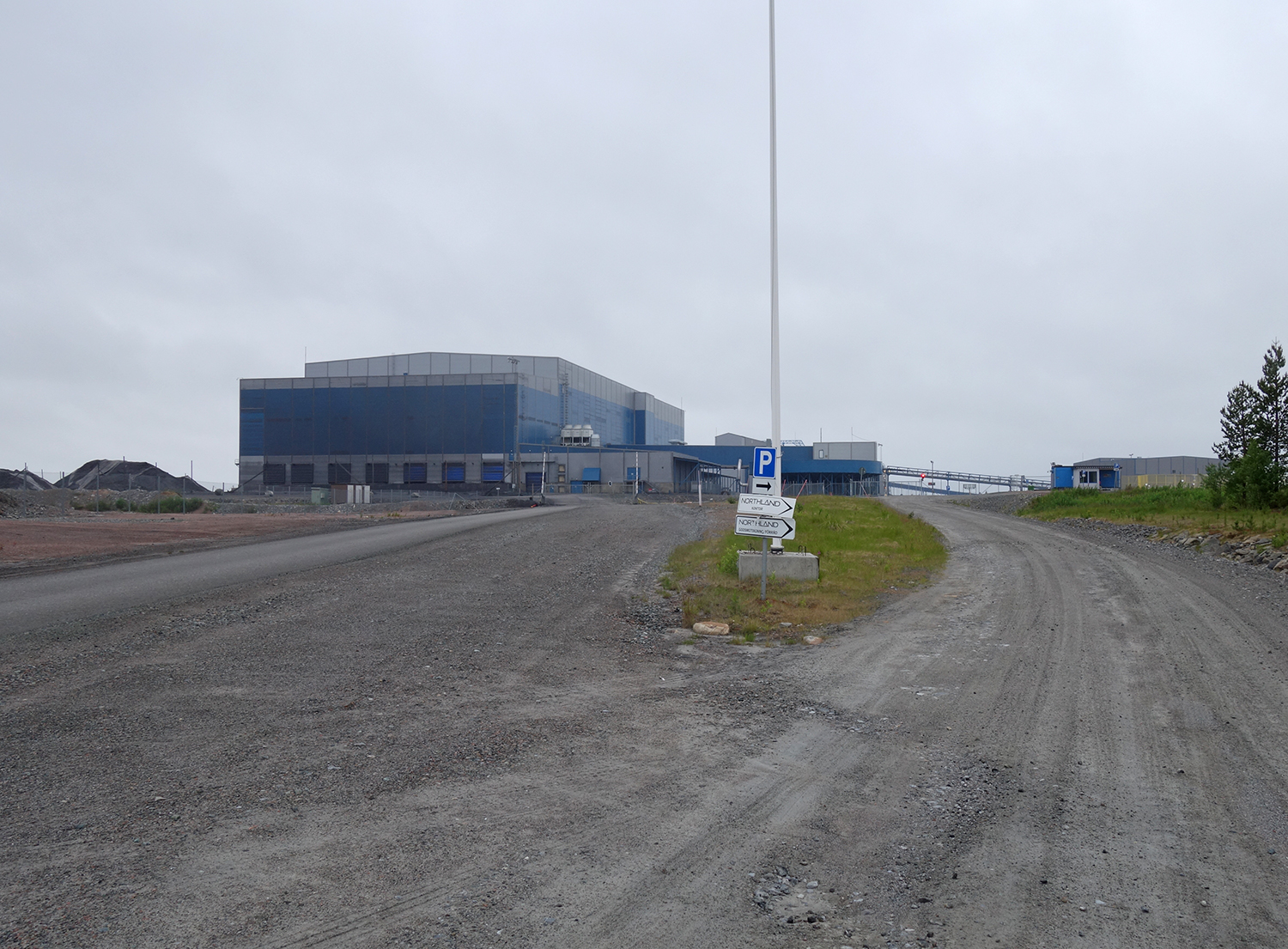
- Buildings at Kaunisvaara mine, after closure.

- Location in Sweden
- Location: Norrbotten County, Sweden; 67°24′56.24″N 23°20′10.99″E
- Products: Iron ore
- Opened: 2010

The Kaunisvaara mine is a large iron mine located in northern Sweden in the village of Kaunisvaara in Norrbotten County. Kaunisvaara represents one of the largest iron ore reserves in Sweden and in the world having estimated reserves of 872 million tonnes of ore grading 32.7% iron metal.

== History ==
Ore production began late 2012, with annual iron ore production planned to reaching 12 million tonnes later, according to the owner, mining company Northland Resources. Ressources are estimated at 176 million tonnes. The mine and mining company went bankrupt in October 2014 because of low iron ore prices and high debts.

In 2017, the mine rights were sold to Kaunis Iron. The company restarted operation of the mine in 2018.

== Transport ==
To transport the ore there was a proposal to build a broad-gauge railway connecting the mine to the Finnish rail network. When Northland got permission to use the existing iron ore harbour in Narvik, the plans changed. The current system involves transporting the iron ore by truck to Svappavaara, and then along the Malmbanan to Narvik (in Norway) to be exported by ship. In 2012, they got permission to run 90 ton trucks between the mine and the loading facility in Svappavaara. The weight limit was set as the bridge over Tärendö River can't handle more (even if a system was set up to make certain only one truck at a time used the bridge). The trucks are specially-built Scania R-series road-trains.
