= Mining in Sweden =

Mining industry in Sweden

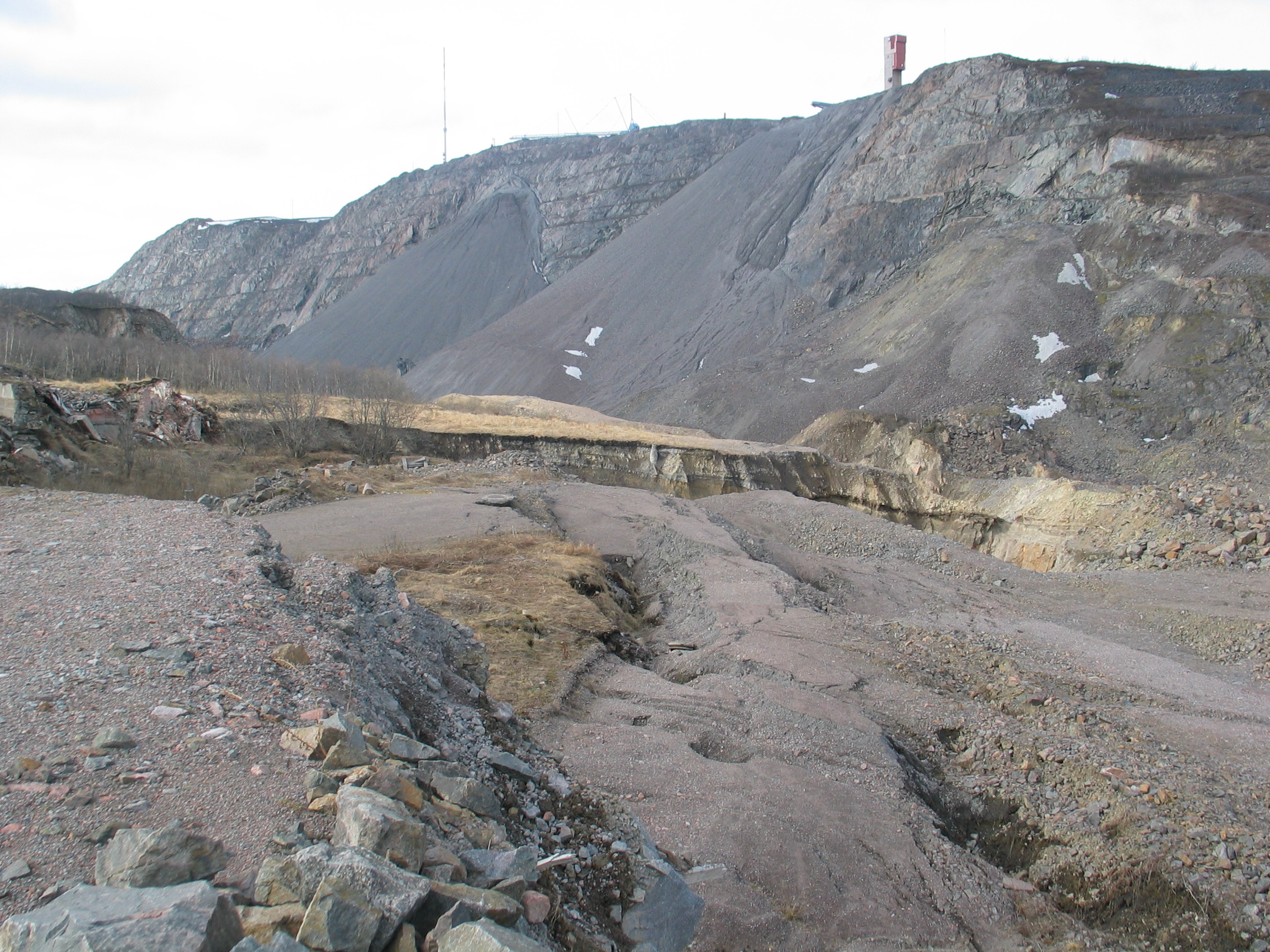
Kiruna iron ore mine in Kiruna, Norrbotten County

The mining industry in Sweden has a history dating back 6,000 years.

Historically, Sweden's most famous mine is the copper Falun Mine in Dalarna, which made a significant contribution to the Swedish economy for several centuries. Sweden today is one of the largest sources of iron ore in Europe, with approximately 90% of Europe's iron and 5% of the world's iron reserves.

== Geology ==
Most of Sweden's landmass is geologically part of the Baltic Shield, which also covers Fennoscandia and northwest parts of Russia. The Baltic Shield has the oldest rock in Europe, and is one of the largest and most active mining areas on the European continent. Most Swedish mines are in the Baltic Shield. The shield, because of its resemblance to the Canadian Shield and cratons in South Africa, is also a source of gold and diamonds.

== Copper ==
Sweden has a long history of mining, dating back thousands of years. Sweden's earliest mining company was Stora Kopparberg, which operated on the copper Falun Mine, the most famous mine in Sweden. It was the source of the pigment falu red that painted castles, churches and cottages still seen throughout Sweden. Income from the Falun mine funded almost all of Sweden's wars throughout its history.

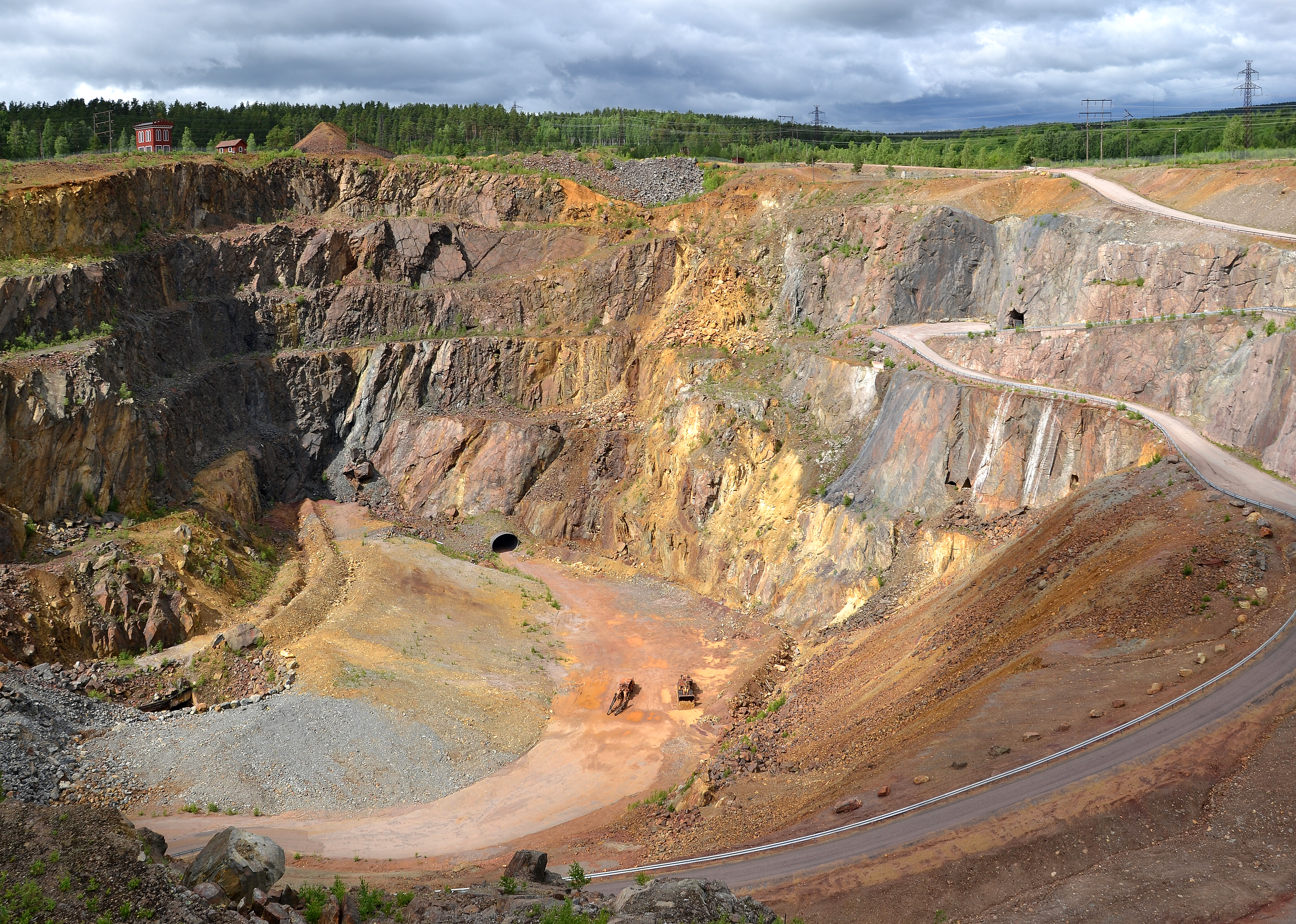
Falun Mine

In the Bronze Age, most copper used in Europe originated in places such as Sicily and Iberia and the Levant. For example, a 3,600 year old copper axe was created in Sweden using copper from Cyprus. Europe's economy at the time relied heavily on copper, the major component of bronze.

Sweden's Falun copper mine opened about 1300. It was the largest copper mine in Sweden, and produced two-thirds of Europe's copper needs. The largest industrial work place in Sweden, at its peak in 1650 the mine produced as much as three kilotons of raw copper in that one year.

== Iron ==
=== History ===
During the High Middle Ages, Sweden's iron industry followed the "eastern branch" iron production, using bowl furnace methods rather than the open hearth "bloomery" model favored in England. One of the most important Swedish iron products was osmund (also called osmond iron), small pieces made from pig iron, weighing no more than 300 grams, suited to the needs of village smithies. Later, production shifted to bar iron.

It was also clear the Swedish iron-smelters were connected to major iron markets outside Sweden, where they also influenced osmund production sold by merchants from the Hanseatic League. Many German miners and merchants (including some from Lübeck) came into Sweden to join Sweden's mining industry. Because of their influence, iron exports from Sweden went primarily to Lübeck and Danzig in modern-day Poland.

Iron, as the major component of steel, is of major importance to mining. Sweden's iron was important to both Nazi Germany and the Allies of World War II.

=== 21st century ===
The country holds 60% of Europe's identified iron ore deposits and is as of 2021 responsible for 90% of Europe's iron ore extraction, and 5% of the world's reserves in 2014. In 2012, Sweden was one of the most active major mining countries in Europe. In the years up to 2013, Sweden's mines were producing around 80 million tons of ore in Sweden per year, mostly from Kiruna Mine, which in 2008 produced 27.5 million tons of iron.

As of 2021 the Swedish government intends to expand and strengthen Sweden's position as a mining nation. Crude steel produced in Sweden in 2017 (4,9 million tons) consisted of 1/3 scrap iron and 2/3 of pig iron made from iron ore.

More than 96% of total ore production comes from the mines in the northern region, known as Norrland. Comprising 10 of the 12 active mines in the country, these mines lie in Sápmi (historically "Lapland"), the traditional territory of the Sámi

=== Impact on people and the environment ===
In 2006, the British/Swedish Beowulf Mining was granted an exploration licence in Jokkmokk municipality, with the intention of exploiting the iron ore at a mine in the Gállok/Kallak area, known as the Kallak mine. The region is used by the Sámi community Jåhkågasska tjiellde for reindeer herding, as it is part of the natural migration route and they graze there all year round. When drilling started in 2013, an anti-mine movement developed consisting of environmental activists and the Sámi community. This continues as of 2022. The Swedish Government refused Beowulf Mining's application in February 2020 but in December 2021, the new Prime Minister of Sweden, Magdalena Andersson, said that Sweden needed more mines.

The Kiruna Mine, the largest iron ore mine pit in Europe, plans to expand operations in the future. The nearby town of Kiruna would be endangered, however, if iron ore is extracted beneath it, which would cause instability in soil and building foundations. In order to resolve this problem, the mining company LKAB plans to move the entire town with its 18,000 people 3 kilometres (1.9 mi) to the east.

One building which will be moved during the relocation is Kiruna Church, a Gothic Revival building built in 1912. Many of the town's other buildings, however, will instead be demolished and rebuilt at a new location by LKAB.

== Gold ==
In the European Union, Sweden is the second largest gold producer after Finland. Sweden may also have large amounts of gold that could be mined in the future.

The name of Swedish mining company Boliden AB comes from the Boliden mine, near Skellefteå, where gold was found in 1924. The Boliden mine was once Europe's largest and richest gold mine, but since 1967 that mine is no longer active. Nevertheless, Boliden AB remains a major producer of gold in Sweden, because their polymetallic mines can produce as much as 2,000 kilograms per year. Some gold is commonly recovered from copper mines in Sweden and Finland.

== Uranium ==
Sweden is estimated to host more than a quarter of Europe's uranium resources. Uranium mining was prohibited in Sweden from 2018 until 2025. Following a parliamentary decision, the prohibition will be formally repealed on 1 January 2026. Oviken and other areas around Storsjön in Jämtland are known to have uranium resources.

== See also ==
- Swedish riksdaler
- Economy of Sweden
- Mineral industry of Europe
