= Hauki quartzite =

Hauki quartzite (Swedish: Haukikvartsiten) is a rock unit of quartz arenite found in northernmost Sweden. More arkosic parts are of reddish colour but otherwise made of light grey rocks. Apart from quart arenite the unit hosts some conglomerates with clasts of phyllite and quartz porphyry. The clasts are derived from the nearby units of Hopukka Formation, Loussavaara Formation and Matojärvi Formation.

== See also ==
- Kiruna mine
- Kiruna porphyry
- Kurravaara conglomerate
