= Munka mine =

Molybdenum mine in Rappen, Arjeplog, Sweden

- Location: Rappen, Sweden, Arjeplog, Sweden
- Products: Molybdenum
- Company: Beowulf Mining

The Munka mine is one of the largest molybdenum mines in Sweden. The mine is located in Rappen geological district of the Arjeplog Municipality in northern Sweden. It is currently owned by Beowulf Mining and has reserves amounting to 1.7 million tonnes of molybdenum ore grading 0.156% molybdenum thus resulting 2,652 tonnes of molybdenum. All exploration work at the mine has been carried out by the Geological Survey of Sweden (SGU).

== See also ==
- List of molybdenum mines
