= NPK (disambiguation) =

NPK may refer to:

- NPK label, the most common labeling convention of the labeling of fertilizers
- NPK (group), a split-off group from TMD located in the Northumberland Park estate of Tottenham
- Noble Park railway station, the station code NPK
- Northland Resources, the FWB code NPK
- National Presto Industries, the NYSE code NPK
