= Kiruna mine =

Underground iron ore mine in Sweden

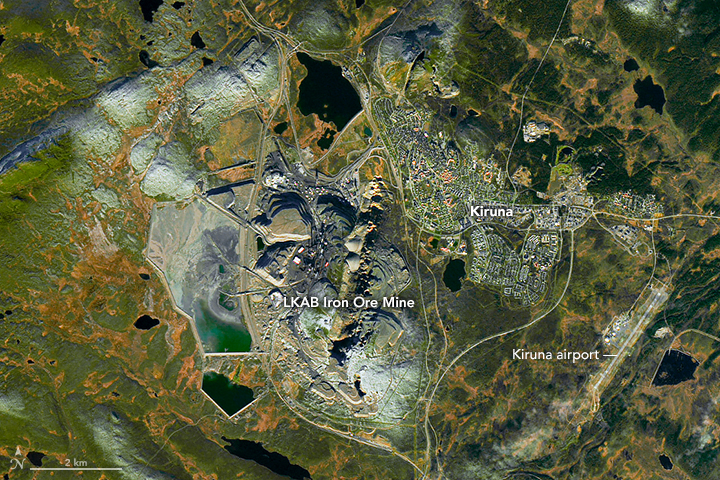
- Kiruna Mine and townsite from Landsat, 2016

- Location in Sweden
- Location: Kiruna, Lapland, Sweden; 67°51′01″N 020°11′34″E
- Products: Iron ore
- Production: 26.9 million tonnes
- Financial year: 2018
- Opened: 1898
- Company: Luossavaara-Kiirunavaara AB

The Kiruna mine is an iron ore mine in Kiruna in Norrbotten County, Lapland, Sweden. The mine is owned by Luossavaara-Kiirunavaara AB (LKAB), a large state owned Swedish mining company. In 2018, the mine produced 26.9 million tonnes of iron ore. The Kiruna mine has an ore body which is 4 km (2.5 mi) long, 80 metres (260 ft) to 120 metres (390 ft) thick and reaching a depth of up to 2 km (1.2 mi). Since mining began at the site in 1898, the mine has produced over 950 million tonnes of ore. As of 2020, the main haulage level is 1,365 m below the ore outcrop at Kiirunavaara that existed prior to mining.

In 2004, it was decided that the present centre of the city would need to be relocated to accommodate mining-related subsidence. The relocation would be made gradually over decades.

On May 18, 2020, an earthquake of approximate 4.9 Mw was triggered in the footwall of the mine. The earthquake was not natural but induced by the mining activity.

== Geology ==
The ore deposit at Kiruna is part of a larger iron ore province stretching west-east from Kiruna to the Finnish border. This province includes thus also the ores at Svappavaara and Pajala. Malmberget is a large notable southward outlier of this province. The largest ore bodies in the province are of iron oxide-apatite type, yet skarn iron deposits exists at Masugnsbyn and Hindersön. The iron ores that lie closest to the Kiirunavaara are Loussavaara, Henry, Nakutus, Rektorn and Lappmalmen.

=== The ore ===
The ore is predominately magnetite and disseminated interstitial apatite, with an average of 0.9% phosphorus. The ore body has the form of a large sheet inclined about 60° to the east. At the surface, this sheet was, before mining, about 4 km long and averages 90 m in width. From geophysical studies, it has been inferred that the ore continues as a coherent sheet at least 1500 m below the surface. In many places, the ore transitions to apparently disorganised ore veins in the country rock. Apatite is by far the main gangue mineral while other gangue minerals are tremolite-actinolite and calcite. Apatite is, in some places, evenly distributed in the magnetite ore, but occurs also as veins and bands. Diopside and biotite are also common gangue minerals but occur only in very small amounts. For reasons related to ore processing, the ore in Kiruna Mine is divided into two quality types based on chemistry, phosphorus-poor B-ore and phosphorus-rich D-ore, the latter being more common closer to the surface.

Within the orebody, there is a volume of hematite ore with the same strike (direction) as the main orebody. The thickness of this seemingly coherent hematite body is mostly within the range of decimeters but at one location it reaches 25 m.

The largest deposit of rare earth metals discovered in Europe was announced by LKAB in January 2023 to be at Kiruna. The rare earth elements have been known about at this location for over 100 years and studied in detail before.

==== Origin ====
The origin of the Kiruna ore has been the matter of a protracted scientific debate, with the main point of contention being whether the ore is solidified magma or not.

The Kiruna mineral deposit was formed following intense volcanic activity. One theory holds that the ores are the result of magmatic differentiation. Iron-rich solutions precipitated the iron on to a syenite porphyry footwall. Then the ore bed was covered by further volcanic deposits, quartz porphyry, and sedimentary rocks. Later the whole body was tilted to its current dip of 50 to 60°.

The hematite bodies of Kiruna are considered by R. Frietsch to be "hydrothermal impregnations".

The geology of the Kiruna ore has many parallels to that of the iron ore of El Laco volcano in Chile, leading to the claim they were both formed by volcanic activity.

In 1973, Tibor Parák pointed out a series of problems with the magmatic origin theory and proposed instead that the ore originated as a sediment in a volcanic environment. In 1975, Párak listed various arguments against a magmatic origin for the ore. The existence of "abundant fragments and balls" of ore found in the hanging wall of the Kiruna Ore and the nearby Loussavaara Ore are deemed by Párak to be contrary to a magmatic origin for the ore. The grading of massive ore into quartz-banded ores at the nearby Per Geijer Ore is also deemed by Parák to be contrary to magmatic origin. Parák also argued that the form of the orebodies as tilted sheets is also indicative of them being sedimentary units. Parák further argues that the "ore breccia" at Loussavaara Ore is due to its chemistry and texture not equivalent to the main ore bodies.

=== Footwall ===
The waste rock at the footwall of the ore is syenite porphyry. At places this syenite porphyry has nodules variously filled with actinolite, apatite, titanite and magnetite. At some locations next to the ore what is thought to be beds of metatuff has been found, these beds vary in thickness with the thickest ones being up to 2 metres (6.6 ft) thick.

In some rare cases, nodules are filled with zircon. To the west, the syenite porphyry borders the Kurravaara conglomerate which underlies it stratigraphically.

=== Hanging wall ===
The hanging wall of the Kiruna ore is made up of quartz porphyry.

== History ==
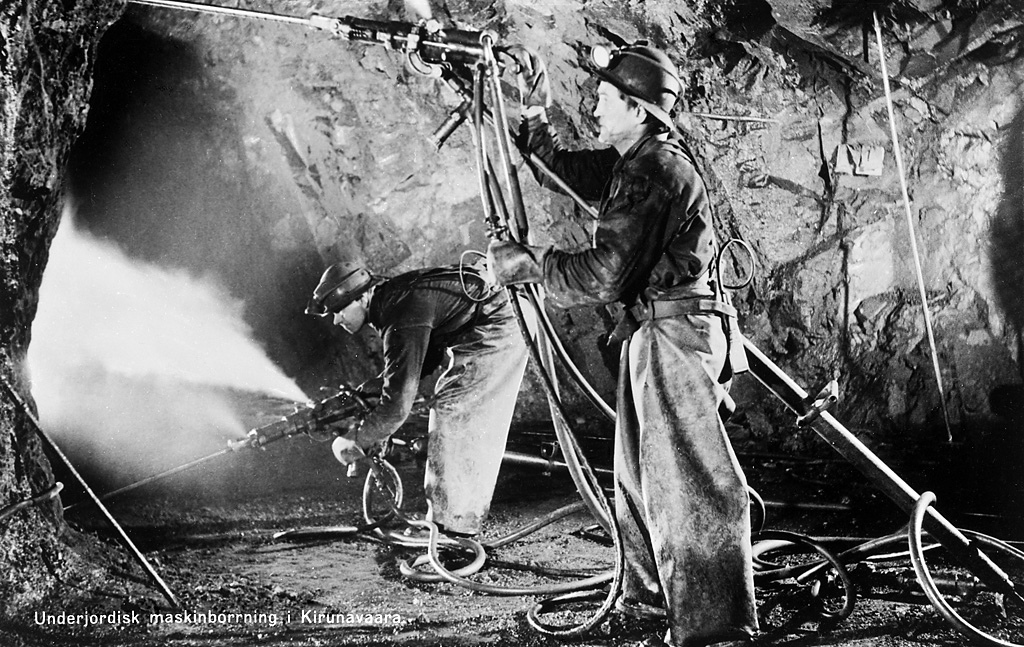
Miners at work, circa 1940–1959

In 1902, the Kiruna Narvik Railway was completed, allowing the shipment of ore through the ice-free port of Narvik.

In the beginning, surface mining was used, but the mine has been mined with the sublevel caving mining method since the 1960s. In 1985, reserves for the Kiruna Mine were 1,800 million tonnes grading 60–65% iron and 0.2% phosphorus. As of 2018 the Kiruna Mine had Proven and Probable Reserves of 683 million tonnes grading 43.8% iron.

Until 1999, the deepest level of the mine reached 775 metres (2,543 ft), but after 1999, mining went deeper, reaching a depth of 1,045 metres (3,428 ft). The 1,045 metres (3,428 ft) level could support iron ore production until 2018. On October 28, 2008, LKAB decided to go even deeper, with the mine reaching a depth of 1,365 metres (4,478 ft) by 2012 at a cost of US$1.7 billion.

Cross section of Kiruna iron ore mine

== Moving the town ==
The re-development of Kiruna is a reconstruction project, as the Kirunavaara mine, run by LKAB, undermines the current town center. The town center is to be moved 3 km (1.9 mi) to the east. 21 of the most important buildings are to be moved.

In 2004, it was decided that the city center would need to be relocated to accommodate mining-related subsidence. The relocation was to be made gradually over the coming decade. In January 2007, a new location was proposed, to the northwest at the foot of Luossavaara mountain, by Lake Luossajärvi.

The first physical work moving the town commenced in November 2007, when work on the new main sewer pipe started.

In the same week, first sketches for the layout of the new part of the town became available. The sketches include a travel center, the new locations for the city hall and the church, an artificial lake and an extension of the Luossavaara hill into the city. The location of the new section of the E10 is still uncertain, as is the location of the railway and the railway station. A more official sketch was published early in the spring of 2008, which was then discussed with various interest groups before a further version was to be produced.

In June 2010, the city council decided that the town would be moved eastwards (to 67°51′1″N 20°18′2″E), in the direction of Tuolluvaara, instead of the proposed northwestern location. The town move was started in 2014 in a process that will continue to 2040, with the center-most part of the town re-established by 2022. White Arkitekter AB based in Gothenburg and Ghilardi + Hellsten Arkitekter based in Oslo together with researchers from Luleå and Delft universities won the contract to design the new city, which envisages a denser city center with a greater focus on sustainability, green and blue infrastructure, pedestrians and public transport rather than automobiles.

== See also ==
- Hauki quartzite
- Kiirunavaara
- Swedish iron ore during World War II
- Underground mining (hard rock)
- Kallak mine
