= Tasman Metals =

Mining company

Tasman Metals, "a Canadian company for jurisdictional and thereby regulatory purposes," is a Vancouver-based mining company that operated in Sweden. From 2009 to 2016 Tasman Metals owned the mining rights to, and explored for, rare earth elements in the Norra Kärr area in the South Swedish highlands. In February 2016 the supreme administrative court of Sweden withdrew Tasman's exploitation concession for Norra Kärr.

Until the mid-2010s Tasman Metals had the Kallak south licence in northern Sweden after which it sold it to Beowulf Mining.

== See also ==
- Canadian mining in Latin America and the Caribbean
