= Kurravaara conglomerate =

Kurravaara conglomerate (Swedish: Kurravaarakonglomeratet) is a rock unit of polymict conglomerate found in northernmost Sweden. It rest confomably on top of greenstones that were originally basaltic lavas and tuff. In one locations both rock units interdigitate. The conglomerate has boulders of porphyritic trachyandesite, iron-apatite oxide and those that are a blend of both rock types. Greenstones are also found as boulders. In some locations the unit is poor in boulders and is made mostly of metatuff. It is overlain by the Hopukka Formation, but no clear contact exists as rock units grade into each other.

== See also ==
- Hauki quartzite
- Kiruna mine
- Kiruna porphyry
