= Tibor Parák =

Hungarian geologist (1928–2023)

Tibor Parák (18 November 1928 – 30 July 2023) was a Hungarian geologist known for his mineral explorations and academic contributions to economic geology. Parák arrived in Sweden from Soviet-occupied Hungary as a refugee in 1956.

Parák published his dissertation on the Kiruna iron ores in 1973. He proposed a sedimentary origin for the iron ore of Kiruna and investigated the connection between the ore districts of Skelleftefältet and Kirunafältet. The thesis and geological ideas of Parák received considerable attention at the time. In the 1970s Parák also envisioned the rare-earth elements in Kiruna's gangue minerals would be economically valuable in the future.

He was active at LKAB as chief geologist from 1974 to 1977. In 1977 he became CEO of a new prospecting company created by LKAB. After criticizing the uranium mining project at Pleutajokk openly for its unprofitable low grade and purported environmental risks these differences made Parák leave LKAB in 1981. Parák's criticism was given some credence when years later the project was abandoned.

In the 1990s he moved into consultancy being involved in various mining projects in Sweden and Brazil.
