= Urban relocation =

Relocation of inhabitants and infrastructure development is facing many urban areas. There are several reasons for urban relocation; industry development, for instance mining, response to natural disaster, for instance tsunami recovery and social/economic renewal. Urban relocation is complex in that it is spanning a number areas of societies; economic, political, social, cultural, religious, and environmental. While urban relocation has taken place historically, also in large scale, the interest in the field is growing as the need to take individuals and organizations rights, democratic, human and others, are increasing the many parts of the world.

Traditionally the field has been part of planning, but in recent years urban relocation has increasingly being viewed as a design situation.

== Examples of design in urban relocation ==
=== New Gällivare – urban relocation in response to mining ===
The pit in Malmberget, resulting from iron ore mining 1,140 meters below. (Photo: LKAB)

In the Malmberget town of Gällivare iron ore mining has for centuries been forcing urban relocation. Recent expansion of the mine demands a major relocation, concerning some 3,800 people of the approx. 16,000 living the city of Gällivare.

The project New Gellivare is a joint effort by Gällivare municipality, the mining company LKAB and the Norrbotten region, also funded by the European Union. This project is based on a co-design process involving hundreds of citizens and local business. The assumption on urban relocation is that a city is not "moved" but is rather built new.

=== Earthquake and tsunami recovery in Chile ===
Tsunami effects in Dichato, Chile: House, street and foundation destroyed. (photo: Lars Albinsson)

The massive 2010 Chile earthquake and the following tsunami destroyed several urban areas along the coast of the Biobio region including the main city of Concepcion.

In response the region organized the PRBC18 office to develop plans for reconstruction. Because Chile is on a tectonic plate border earthquakes are frequent. Therefore, rebuilding similar buildings in the same place is avoided in favor of new designs that will protect people and property. This includes development of tsunami mitigation areas, a redesign of the shorelines of several coastal towns and villages to better resist the effects of future tsunamis.

In the town of Llico a number of stakeholders; citizens, fishermen, restaurant owners came together to co-design a new ocean front to also support tourism business development. This includes shell fish growths and processing, restaurant locations and tourism area.
