= Felsite =

Very fine-grained volcanic rock that sometimes contains larger crystals

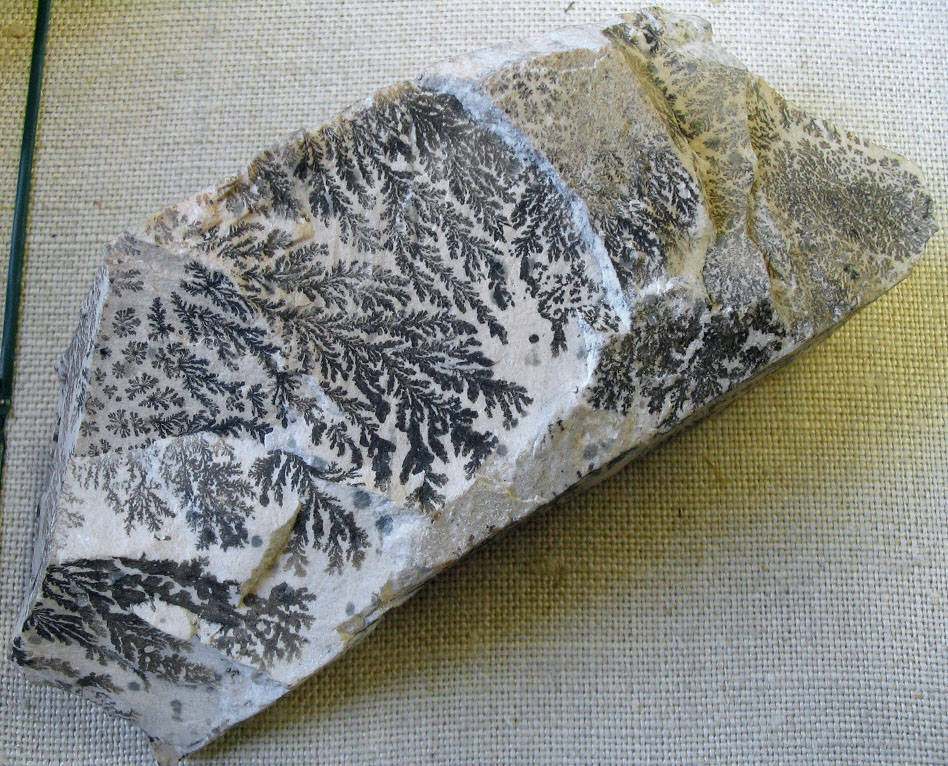
Felsite covered with dendritic pyrolusite

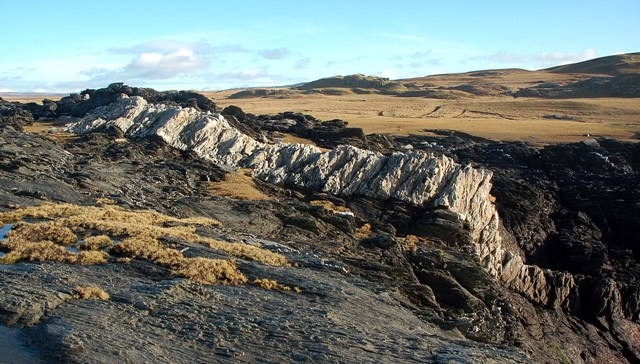
Dike of felsite on Islay in Scotland

Felsite is a very fine-grained volcanic rock that may or may not contain larger crystals. Felsite is a field term for a light-colored rock that typically requires petrographic examination or chemical analysis for more precise definition. Color is generally white through light gray, or red to tan and may include any color except dark gray, green or black (the colors of trap rock). The mass of the rock consists of a fine-grained matrix of felsic materials, particularly quartz, plagioclase and potassium feldspar, and may be termed a quartz felsite or quartz porphyry if the quartz phenocrysts are present. This rock is typically of extrusive origin, formed by compaction of fine volcanic ash, and may be found in association with obsidian and rhyolite. In some cases, it is sufficiently fine-grained for use in making stone tools. Its fine texture and felsic components allow for good knapped pieces, much like working chert, producing conchoidal fracture.

Dendritic manganese oxides such as pyrolusite or iron oxides such as limonite may precipitate along rock crevices, giving some rock chunk surfaces multicolored or arborescent patterned textures.
