= Mertainen =

Iron mine in Lapland, Sweden

Mertainen mine
- Location in Sweden
- Location: Kiruna, Norrbotten County, Sweden; 67°42′25.68″N 20°47′23.22″E
- Products: Iron ore
- Closed: 2016
- Company: Luossavaara-Kiirunavaara AB

The Mertainen is an iron ore deposit and mine in Lapland, Sweden, Sweden. It is located about 30 km southeast of the town of Kiruna. In December 2016 Luossavaara-Kiirunavaara AB closed the mine for indefinite time. Re-opening the mine remains a possibility according to LKAB executive Magnus Arnkvist.

The ore is chiefly magnetite with small amounts of hematite. The deposit has a few small massive magnetite bodies and a larger volume of low grade ore made up of host-rock intruded by magnetite veins. The host rock is made up of scapolite and biotite-altered Syenite Porphyry. The Syenite Porphyry display magnetite nodules.

Most of the deposit has a low phosphorus grade (0.05%) but in the northeast phosphorus grades are higher (0.2 to 0.9%).

== See also ==
- Swedish iron ore during World War II
