= Paleoproterozoic =

First era of the Proterozoic Eon

- 2500 – 1600 Ma
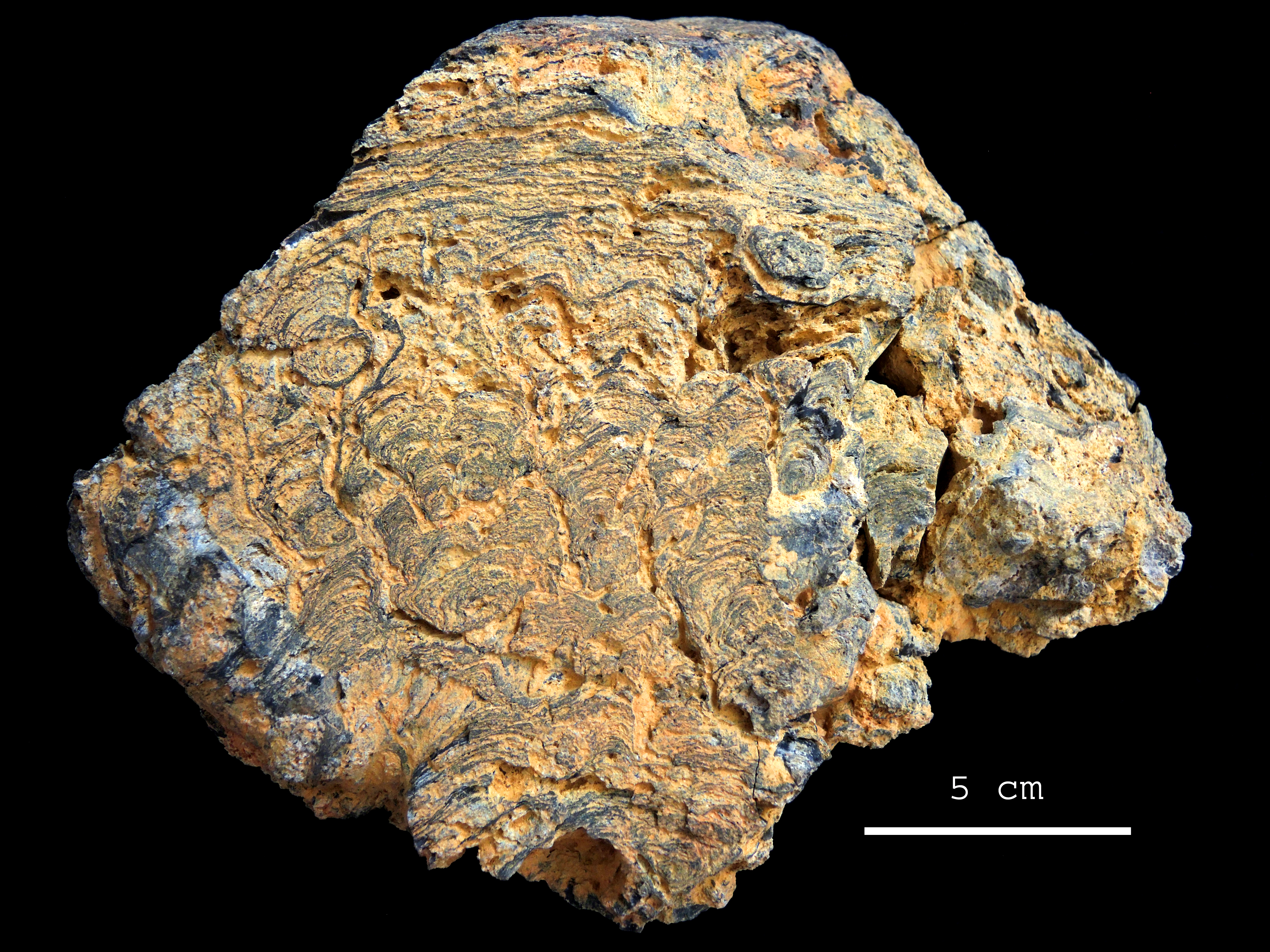
- Paleoproterozoic stromatolites

Chronology
An approximate timescale of key Paleoproterozoic events Vertical axis scale: Millions of years ago
- Proposed redefinition(s): 2420–1780 Ma; Gradstein et al., 2012
- Proposed subdivisions: Oxygenian Period, 2420–2250 Ma Gradstein et al., 2012; Jatulian/Eukaryian Period, 2250–2060 Ma; Gradstein et al., 2012; Columbian Period, 2060–1780 Ma Gradstein et al., 2012

Etymology
- Name formality: Formal
- Alternate spelling(s): Palaeoproterozoic

Usage information
- Celestial body: Earth
- Regional usage: Global (ICS)
- Time scale(s) used: ICS Time Scale

Definition
- Chronological unit: Era
- Stratigraphic unit: Erathem
- Time span formality: Formal
- Lower boundary definition: Defined Chronometrically
- Lower GSSA ratified: 1990
- Upper boundary definition: Defined Chronometrically
- Upper GSSA ratified: 1990

The Paleoproterozoic Era (Note: There are several ways of pronouncing Paleoproterozoic, including IPA: /ˌpælioʊˌproʊtərəˈzoʊɪk, ˌpeɪ-, -liə-, -ˌprɒt-, -əroʊ-, -trə-, -troʊ-/ PAL-ee-oh-PROH-tər-ə-ZOH-ik, PAY-, -PROT-, -ər-oh-, -trə-, -troh-.) (also spelled Palaeoproterozoic) is the first of the three sub-divisions (eras) of the Proterozoic eon, and also the longest era of the Earth's geological history, spanning from 2,500 to 1,600 million years ago (2.5–1.6 Ga). It is further subdivided into four geologic periods, namely the Siderian, Rhyacian, Orosirian and Statherian.

Paleontological evidence suggests that the Earth's rotational rate ~1.8 billion years ago equated to 20-hour days, implying a total of ~450 days per year. It was during this era that the continents first stabilized.

== Cyanobacteria ==
The Paleoproterozoic has the oldest known (established) cyanobacterial fossils, those of Eoentophysalis belcherensis, from 2.0165 billion years ago. As the first organisms known to have produced oxygen, cyanobacteria are generally thought responsible for oxygenation of Earth's atmosphere and the Great Oxidation Event (GOE) 2.46–2.426 billion years ago. Their evolution was also proposed to have caused a subsequent Makganyene "snowball earth" 2.3–2.2 billion years ago. The chronology of the GOE preceding a Paleoproterozoic snowball Earth has been argued unambiguously confirmed, but evidences suggest cyanobacteria likely evolved earlier.

While still debated within the last few years, based on genetic analysis, recent science (2026) considers it established that cyanobacteria, or their common ancestor, originated as early as 2.9 to three billion years ago, in the Mesoarchean. The evolution of oxygenic photosynthesis can be seen before the Great Oxidation Event, evidenced by the production of oxygen in Neoarchaean water environments following the Mesoarchean. Possible but questionable cyanobacterial fossils date back to 3.4 billion years ago, the Palaeoarchaean.

== Atmosphere ==
The Earth's atmosphere was originally a weakly reducing atmosphere consisting largely of nitrogen, methane, ammonia, carbon dioxide and inert gases, in total comparable to Titan's atmosphere. When oxygenic photosynthesis evolved in cyanobacteria during the Mesoarchean, the increasing amount of byproduct dioxygen began to deplete the reductants in the ocean, land surface and the atmosphere.

Eventually all surface reductants (particularly ferrous iron, sulfur and atmospheric methane) were exhausted, and the atmospheric free oxygen levels soared permanently during the Siderian and Rhyacian periods in an aerochemical event called the Great Oxidation Event, which brought atmospheric oxygen from near none to up to 10% of the modern level.

== Life ==
At the beginning of the preceding Archean eon, almost all existing lifeforms were single-cell prokaryotic anaerobic organisms whose metabolism was based on a form of cellular respiration that did not require oxygen. Autotrophs were either chemosynthetic, or relied upon anoxygenic photosynthesis. After the Great Oxygenation Event, the then mainly archaea-dominated anaerobic microbial mats were devastated as free oxygen is highly reactive and biologically toxic to cellular structures. This was compounded by a 300-million-year-long global icehouse event known as the Huronian glaciation — at least partly due to the depletion of atmospheric methane, a powerful greenhouse gas — resulting in what is widely considered one of the first and most significant mass extinctions on Earth.

The organisms that thrived after the extinction were mainly aerobes that evolved bioactive antioxidants and eventually aerobic respiration. Surviving anaerobes were forced to live symbiotically alongside aerobes in hybrid colonies, which enabled the evolution of mitochondria in eukaryotic organisms, with the oldest known Eukaryote, Tappania plana, appearing by the end of the Paleoproterozoic. Thylakoid-bearing cyanobacteria evolved by 1.75 Ga, as evidenced by fossils from the McDermott Formation of Australia.

Many crown node eukaryotes (from which the modern-day eukaryotic lineages would have arisen) have been approximately dated to around the time of the Paleoproterozoic Era. While there is some debate as to the exact time at which eukaryotes evolved, current understanding places it somewhere in this era. Statherian fossils from the Changcheng Group in North China provide evidence that eukaryotic life was already diverse by the late Palaeoproterozoic.

== Geological events ==
During this era, the earliest global-scale continent-continent collision belts developed. The associated continent and mountain building events are represented by the 2.1–2.0 Ga Trans-Amazonian and Eburnean orogens in South America and West Africa; the ~2.0 Ga Limpopo Belt in southern Africa; the 1.9–1.8 Ga Trans-Hudson, Penokean, Taltson–Thelon, Wopmay, Ungava and Torngat orogens in North America, the 1.9–1.8 Ga Nagssugtoqidian orogen in Greenland; the 1.9–1.8 Ga Kola–Karelia, Svecofennian, Volhyn-Central Russian, and Pachelma orogens in Baltica (Eastern Europe); the 1.9–1.8 Ga Akitkan Orogen in Siberia; the ~1.95 Ga Khondalite Belt; the ~1.85 Ga Trans-North China Orogen in North China; and the 1.8-1.6 Ga Yavapai and Mazatzal orogenies in southern North America.

That pattern of collision belts supports the formation of a Proterozoic supercontinent named Columbia or Nuna. That continental collisions suddenly led to mountain building at large scale is interpreted as having resulted from increased biomass and carbon burial during and after the Great Oxidation Event: Subducted carbonaceous sediments are hypothesized to have lubricated compressive deformation and led to crustal thickening.

Felsic volcanism in what is now northern Sweden led to the formation of the Kiruna and Arvidsjaur porphyries.

The lithospheric mantle of Patagonia's oldest blocks formed.

== See also ==
- Boring Billion – Earth history, 1.8 to 0.8 billion years ago
- Suavjärvi impact structure – Lake and claimed impact structure in Karelia, northwest Russia
- Francevillian biota – Possible Palaeoproterozoic multicellular fossils from Gabon
- Vredefort impact structure – Largest verified impact structure on Earth
- Sudbury Basin – Impact structure in Ontario, Canada
- Neoarchean – Fourth era of the Archean Eon, which immediately preceded the Paleoproterozoic
