= Mineral industry of Europe =

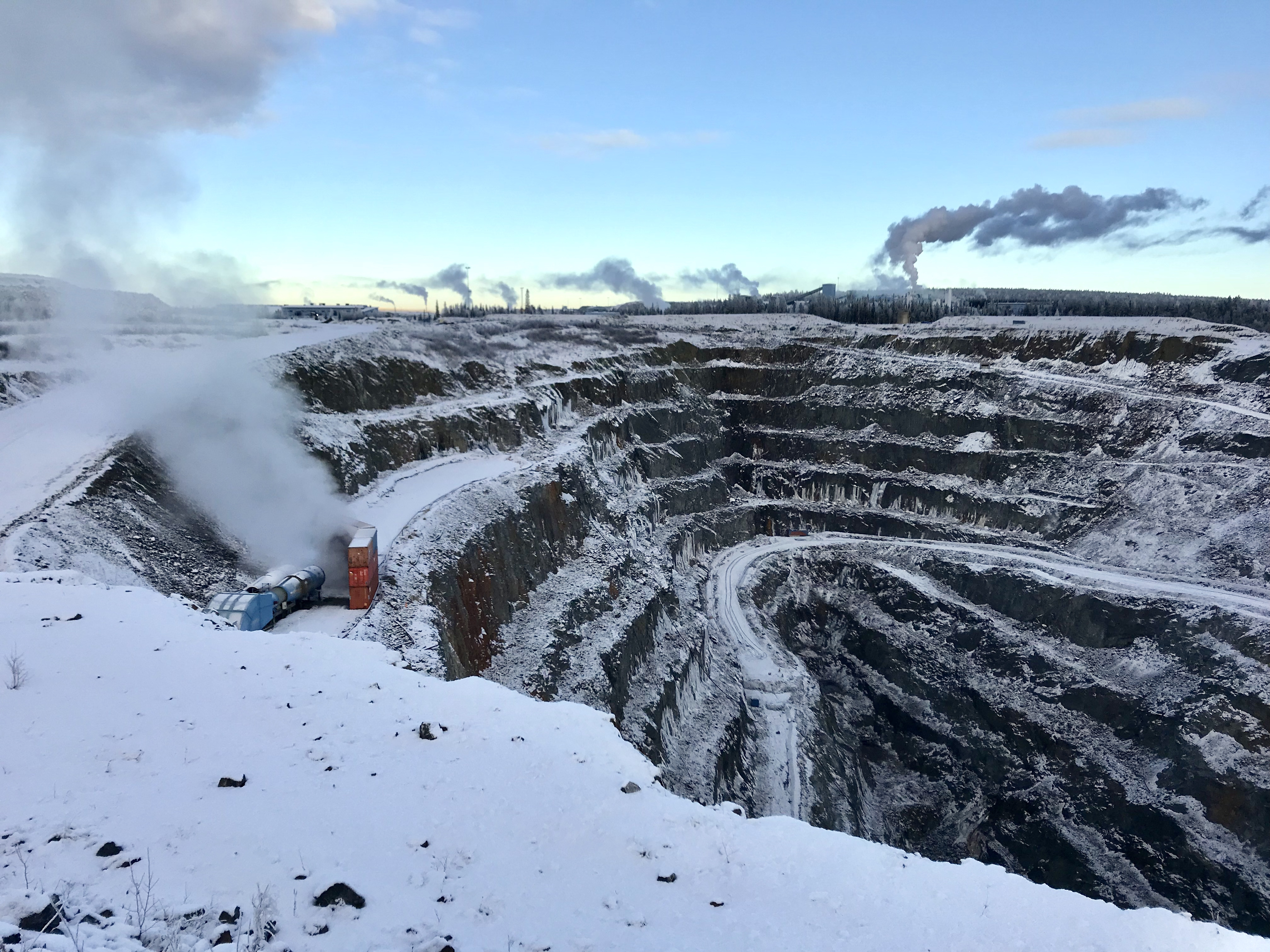
Kittilä mine is the biggest gold mine in Europe. Finland has the largest concentration and production of gold in the European Union.

The European mining industry has a long tradition. Although the continent's mines earn a small share of GDP, they provide a large and significant share of world-wide production.

Before World War II, the economy of Europe relied largely on coal as its source of primary energy with very little of the diversification into oil and gas that had already occurred in the United States. Coal, which was a major fuel for the world's largest economies for more than a century, is now giving way to renewables. The United Kingdom was one of the earliest adopters of renewable energy and had the fifth largest wind power production among the countries in the world in 2025. The UK was the first of the G7 countries to stop generating electricity from coal, which it did on 30 September 2025.

The continent itself is rich in natural resources, and minerals, which are use in everyday life such as construction materials for infrastructure, building, roads, production of steel, cars, computers, medicines and fertilisers. The mining and quarrying industry which extracts these minerals is very important to industrial, social and technological process in the European Union. Industrial minerals, such as barytes, kaolinite or salt, are extracted within the European Union to supply a wide range of industries.

Of those, Sweden is one of the European Union's leading ore and metal-producing countries and the Swedish mining industry is in a period of strong growth. An expanding Swedish mining industry would also contribute to greater self-sufficiency in the European Union, which was a priority in the "Raw Materials Initiative – meeting our critical need for growth and jobs in Europe", presented by the European Commission in 2008 and 2010. By 2020, resource mines in the European Union can possibly become diversified.

Europe's mining industry had a long, profitable history, dating as far back as 8,000 years ago in eastern Europe, and mining copper as far back as early in eastern Europe and Spain. In Ancient Rome, mining for gold and copper in Spain, Cyprus and eastern Europe and tin in Cornwall were important. Dating back as far as the Neolithic, all kinds of mineral rocks were mined in all parts of Europe. Underground mining required significantly more energy than surface operations because of the need for ventilation and pumps, and the longer haulage distances involved.

== Employment ==
The European metals and minerals mining sector employs more than 200,000 people directly in the extraction and beneficiation processes and numerous jobs are depending on it, the turnover of Europe alone is €13 billion Euros. In addition, there are another 100,000 people working at subsidiaries across the world, depending on Europe based headquarters of mining companies. In western Europe, about 182,000 jobs in coal-mining were lost between 1988 and 1993, a reduction in employment by 40%, whereas coal production fell by about 8%, reflecting significant gains in productivity.

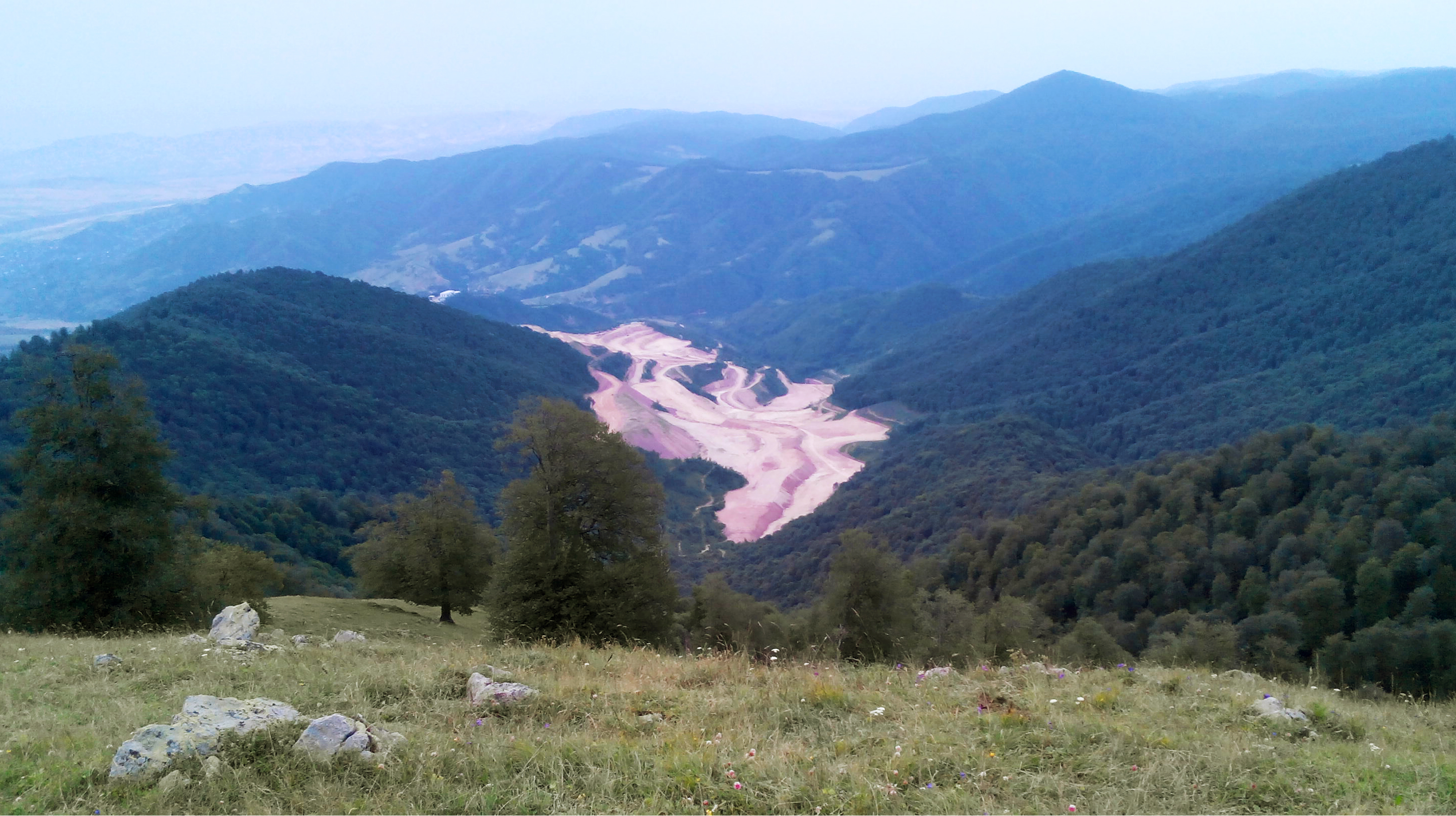
Boundary view of the Teghut Mine, which has been confirmed to be valued over 20 billion USD, due to its copper and molybdenum deposits, located in Armenia.

In 2012, an estimated 7 million people were employed in the mining industry, most of them in coal (including lignite) mining.

== Profits ==
Domestic mine production of industrial metals (excluding coal) was valued approximately $11 billion in 2018 compared with $10 billion in 2007 and $9.2 billion in 2006; the real producer's price index for industrial minerals in Germany increased about 3% in 2008, compared with 4% in 2007.

== Natural resources ==
=== Lignite ===
Several European countries are investigating in lignite mineral industry, despite the fact that the industry faces declining profit margins in competition with low-carbon energy production. The global lignite production is approximately one billion metric tons in 2012, with major production coming from Europe, the continent accounts for roughly 40% in lignite reserves. The Kosovar lignite mines are operated at one of the most strategic lignite deposits in Europe, due to its geological conditions.

In terms of lignite production, Greece ranks seventh worldwide and third in EU after Germany, based on the total lignite reserves in the country and the planned future consumption rate, it is estimated that the reserves in the country could last for more than 45 years. Poland is one of the largest lignite reserves in the European Union, with around 1.4 billion tons of lignite in the country, and an additional 22.1 billion tons in economic reserves.

=== Gold ===
The northern part of Europe, in particular Sweden and Finland, has shown to be an area with an abundance and large potential for gold mining. According to the magazine Tekniikka ja Talous, Finland has overtaken Sweden to become one of the largest producer of gold in Europe, which is located in Kittilä and is owned by the Canadian company Agnico Eagle, will be expanded out and, as a result, its production will increase to 6,000 kilograms per year. In the 13th and 14th centuries, Bohemia was one of the main regions of gold production in Europe.

=== Coal ===
The total production of coal in Europe is about 15.14 million tons, translating to 3.9% of the total coal produced in the world, coal is preferred as a source of energy, due to its low cost compared to petroleum and natural gases. Europe's coal industry continues its downward spiral as 25% of European Union countries have now shut down its mines to the energy source, scientists estimate that more than 80% of global coal reserves should stay unburned in order to limit global warming to 2 °C (3.6 °F).

=== Iron ore ===
Sweden accounts for 91% of the continent's ore. In 2014, Swedish ore production broke a new record for the fifth year in a row; the increase was 2% from the previous year, and production amounted to almost 89.1 million tons. Of all the global market mining of ore, eastern Europe was the smallest region accounting around just 1% of the market, the use of robots in the metal ore mining industry is improving the efficiency and productivity of mines and reduces operational costs. The EU metallic mining sector produces a wide range of ores yielding metal substances.

== See also ==
- Euromines
- Extractivism
- Mining in the United Kingdom
- Mining in Sweden
- Mineral industry of Armenia
