= Arvidsjaur porphyry =

Igneous rocks found in northernmost Sweden

Arvidsjaur porphyry (Swedish: Arvidsjaurporfyr) is a group of igneous rocks of intermediate to felsic composition found near Arvidsjaur in northern Sweden. The Arvidsjaur Porphyry formed 1,870 to 1,880 million years ago during the Paleoproterozoic Era.

Most of the porphyry have well-preserved primary structures and textures which have allowed to interpret much of Arvidsjaur porphyry to be ignimbrites. While much of the porphyryry have rhyolite compositions some parts that are interpreted as lava flows are made up of andesite with plagioclase phenocrysts.
