= Ballek =

Ballek Copper/Gold Deposit
Location
- Location: Norrbotten, Sweden

Production
- Products: Copper, Gold, Uranium

Owner
- Company: Beowulf Mining (50%), Energy Ventures Limited (50%)
- Acquired: 2009

The Ballek Copper/Gold deposit contains 43,000 tonnes of Copper and 52,000 ounces of gold and is owned by Wayland Copper Limited, a joint venture between Energy Ventures Limited (EVE) and Beowulf Mining. The equity in Wayland is split evenly between the two partners, with Beowulf acting as operator. Currently five licences make up the Ballek project, which covers an area of roughly 110 km^{2} in Norrbotten County, Sweden.

The Lulepotten deposit, one of the five Ballek licences, was discovered by the Geological Survey of Sweden in the 1960s. Further drilling took place until 1978 over a total of 22,265 metres, identifying the strike length of the deposit at over 1500 metres. Lulepotten was acquired by Beowulf, along with the Ballek 2 and 3 licences in 2005, while Ballek 4 was awarded to Beowulf later in the same year. In 2007 a prospective uranium deposit, Ballek 5, was awarded to Beowulf. Later in 2007 a joint venture agreement was signed between Beowulf and Agricola Resources. In 2008 a maiden JORC inferred resource estimate was attained on Lulepotten, with 5.4 million tonnes of Copper at 0.8% and 0.3 grammes per tonne of gold. The total metal contained is therefore 43,000 tonnes of Copper and 52,000 ounces of gold. Beowulf Mining acquired the Ballek deposit in its entirety, as well as the Geddaur licences, the Mannakjaure licence and the Riikalahti licence, from Agricola Resources in 2009. In 2010 Beowulf mining entered into a joint venture with EVE following completion of a 1601-metre drill programme. Simple flotation processing of Lulepotten ore yields a product containing 32.4% Copper with a mass recovery of over 96%
