= Kiruna porphyry =

Igneous rocks found in northernmost Sweden

Kiruna porphyry (Swedish: Kirunaporfyr) is a group of igneous rocks found near Kiruna in northernmost Sweden. The Kiruna Porphyry formed 1,880 to 1,900 million years ago during the Paleoproterozoic Era in connection to the Svecofennian orogeny.

The iron-apatite ore mined in Kiruna, Malmberget and Svappavaara are all hosted in Kiruna porphyry. While generally well-preserved for its age at some locations such as Malmberget the Kiruna porphyry is more metamorphosed.

In detail, various rock types are distinguished in the Kiruna porphyry such as trachyandesite lava and quartz-bearing porphyry of rhyolitic composition. These two rocks are traditionally known as "syenite porphyry" and "quartz porphyry" respectively (Swedish: syenitporfyr, kvartsporfyr). The former is found on the foot wall of the Kiruna iron ore body, while the latter is found in the hanging wall. Part of the quartz-bearing porphyry is thought to be ignimbrite. The Haparanda Series of rocks found to east near the Sweden-Finland border are thought to have the same origin as the Kiruna porphyry.

== See also ==
- Kurravaara conglomerate
