= Malmberget =

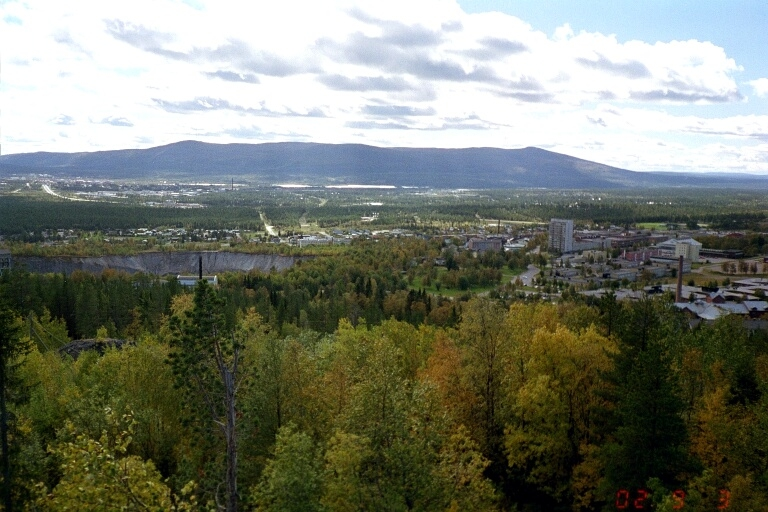
- Malmberget. "The Pit" is visible in the centre-left of the image. In the background Gällivare and the Dundret mountain.

- Location within Norrbotten Location within Sweden
- Coordinates: 67°10′N 20°40′E
- Country: Sweden
- Province: Lapland
- County: Norrbotten County
- Municipality: Gällivare Municipality

Area
  - Total: 1.64 km^{2} (0.63 sq mi)

Population (31 December 2020)
  - Total: 927
- Time zone: UTC+1 (CET)
  - Summer (DST): UTC+2 (CEST)

Malmberget (lit. 'The Ore Mountain'; Finnish: Malmivaara; Meänkieli: Malmivaara) is a locality and mining town situated in Gällivare Municipality, Norrbotten County, Sweden. It had 5,590 inhabitants in 2010, reduced to 927 by December 2020. It is situated five kilometres (3 mi) from the municipal seat of Gällivare.

The entire Malmberget town was moved in 2020/2021 due to mining activities in the area.

Malmberget is known as a major site for the extraction of iron ore from deep mines by Swedish mining company LKAB. Iron ore mining started in 1741 at Illuvaara mountain, later known as Gällivare Malmberg and eventually just Malmberget. The first train transporting iron ore was loaded in 1888—the beginning of the great iron ore rush that would change the entire area of Northern Lapland. In Malmberget there was plentiful employment, but no dwellings—a striking resemblance to the conditions during some of the gold rushes in North America. During the first years, workers lived in shacks built from waste dynamite crates.

In the centre of Malmberget, the deep mine has reached daylight and created a large hole called Kaptensgropen ('The Captain's Pit'). In March 2012, Kaptensgropen was joined with a new pit resulting from the planned sub-level caving of the Fabian deposit, and has grown southwards as the deep mining continues, dividing the town and making the old town centre uninhabitable, forcing many institutions, such as two cinemas and a church, to move to the western part of Malmberget or, even more commonly, to the neighbouring town of Gällivare.

Today, Kaptensgropen is being back-filled with waste rock produced by the underground mines. Kaptensgropen will eventually be filled in, but the uninhabitable area is continually growing as underground mining undermines the area and seismic events caused by the mining regularly shake the remaining parts of Malmberget. The future of Malmberget was for a long time uncertain, but exploration by LKAB indicated that even more of Malmberget may need to be moved in the future. The moving of several large residential houses owned by the mining company, as well as private villas, has been a major issue locally for the past few years.

The iron ore extracted from Malmberget is transported by rail southeast to the port of Luleå.

== Sports ==
Malmberget's largest sports association is named Malmbergets allmänna idrottsförening (MAIF) which has an athletic tradition spanning more than a hundred years. MAIF's colors are green and white.

The local football club is Gällivare Malmbergets FF.

The famous Track and field athlete, Ruth Svedberg, was born here

== See also ==
- Malmberget mine
- Swedish iron ore during World War II
