= Ruoutevare mine =

Mine in Sweden

Ruoutevare Iron Deposit
- Location: Kvikkjokk, Jokkmokk, Sweden
- Products: Iron ore titanium
- Company: Beowulf Mining
- Website: www.beowulfmining.net

The Ruoutevare Iron Deposit is one of the largest known unexploited iron ore deposits in Sweden. Located in Kvikkjokk in Norrbotten County, Lapland, the deposit was discovered in the early 1970s by the Geological Survey of Sweden and found to have between 116 and 123 million tonnes of iron ore. In 2008 Beowulf Mining announced a maiden JORC compliant resource estimate for Ruoutevare with an inferred mineral resource estimate of 140 million tonnes of iron ore at a grade of 39.1%, with 5.7% titanium and 0.2% Vanadium.

An independent conceptual study in 2010 by the Raw Materials Group confirmed the deposit could be commercially exploited, mining 10 million tonnes of ore per year. Subsequent ground magnetic studies have revealed the possibility of significant increases to the quantity of iron ore at Ruoutevare, with the resource possibly containing up to 250 million tonnes of iron ore at grades of approximately 40%.
