= Kaunisvaara =

Coordinates: 67°23′N 23°21′E

Kaunisvaara is a village in northern Sweden, in Pajala Municipality, 100 km north of the Arctic Circle.

== Mining ==
There are large magnetite (iron ore) deposits in this area; Northland Resources began constructing the first mine in December 2011. Ore production was expected to begin in 2012, with annual iron ore production reaching 12 million tonnes by 2014. Reserves are estimated at 176 million tonnes. The mine went bankrupt in October 2014 because of low iron ore prices and high debts.

== History ==
In 2009, archaeologists commissioned by Northland Resources found evidence of stone-age settlements, dated to 9300BCE, in the area; this has shed new light on the timeline of deglaciation and human settlement in northern Europe.
