= Malmberget mine =

Iron ore mine in northern Sweden

- Location in Sweden
- Location: Malmberget, Lapland, Sweden; 67°11′45″N 20°42′29″E
- Products: Iron ore
- Company: Luossavaara-Kiirunavaara AB

The Malmberget mine (Swedish: Malmbergsgruvan) is one of the largest iron ore mines in the world. The mine is located in Malmberget in Norrbotten County, Lapland, it is owned by Luossavaara-Kiirunavaara AB (LKAB). The mine has an annual production capacity of over 5 million tonnes of iron ore and has reserves amounting to 350 million tonnes of ore grading 43.8% iron, resulting 153.3 million tonnes of iron. In 2009, the mine produced 4.3 million tonnes of iron.

The main level of the mine is situated at 1,250 metres, while the deepest point reaches 1,390 metres below ground.

The iron-apatite ore of the mine is hosted in igneous rocks known as the Kiruna Porphyry.

The mine was evacuated as a precaution during the 2024 CrowdStrike incident on 19 July 2024.
