= Svappavaara =

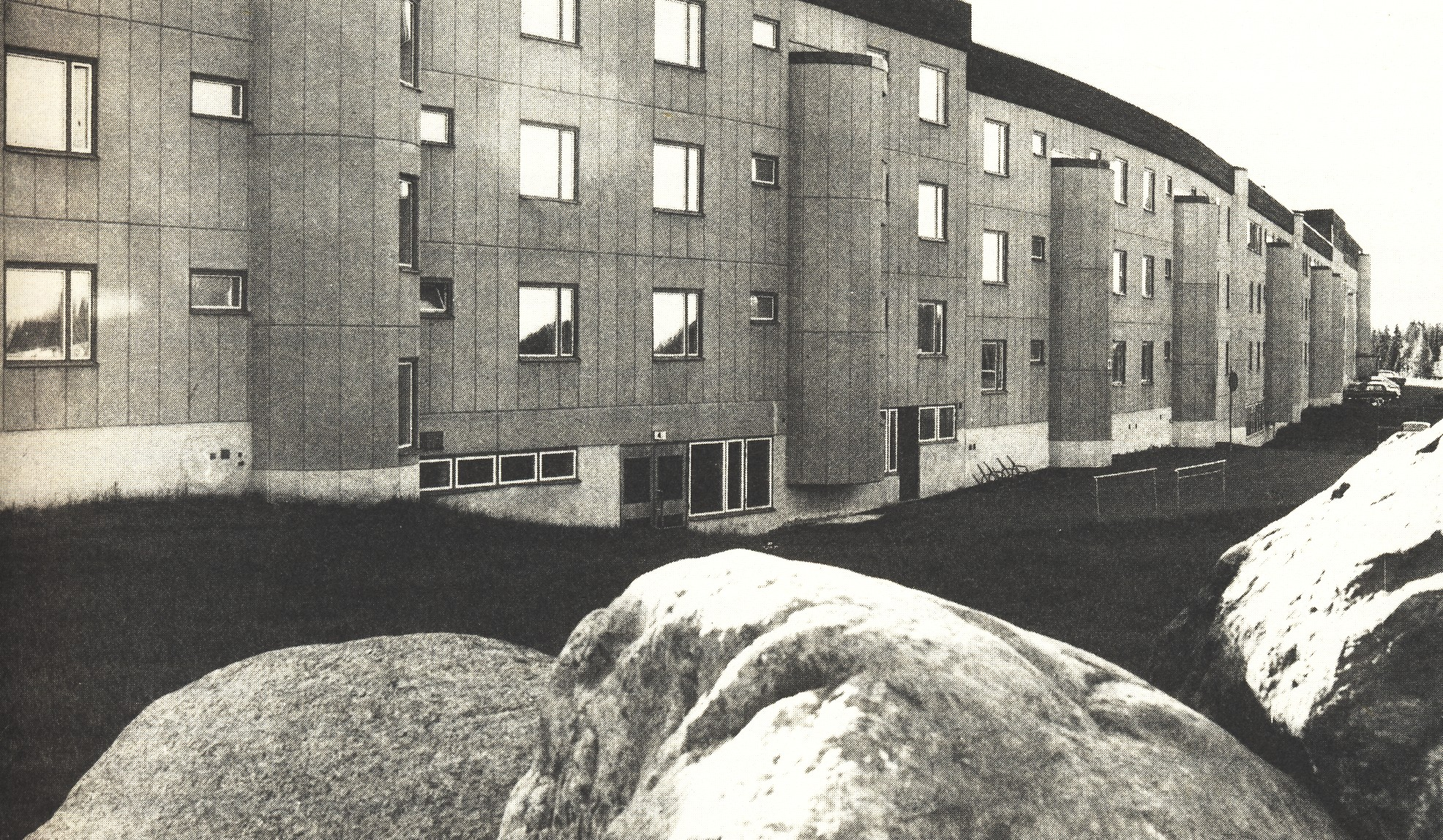
- One of the original buildings at Svappavaara, designed by Ralph Erskine, which forms a long wind break.

- Location within Norrbotten Location within Sweden
- Coordinates: 67°39′N 21°03′E
- Country: Sweden
- Province: Lapland
- County: Norrbotten County
- Municipality: Kiruna Municipality

Area
  - Total: 0.92 km^{2} (0.36 sq mi)

Population (31 December 2010)
  - Total: 417
  - Density: 456/km^{2} (1,180/sq mi)
- Time zone: UTC+1 (CET)
  - Summer (DST): UTC+2 (CEST)

Svappavaara (Meänkieli: Vaskivuori; Northern Sami: Veaikkevárri) is a locality situated in Kiruna Municipality, Norrbotten County, Sweden with 392 inhabitants in 2023. (1) It is a mining village. Mining was started around 1650. Large-scale iron mining began in 1965, when LKAB inaugurated the Svappavaara mine along with two new pelletising plants in Svappavaara and Kiruna. The mine was closed in 1983, but enrichment of iron ore from the mine at Kiruna is still going on. The mine is owned by LKAB, and was reopened in 2023, for mineral research purposes.

The designers of Fermont in Northern Canada used concepts developed by Erskine in the development of windscreen buildings. Erskine was also a member of the Fermont Design Panel, and provided key ideas around windscreen buildings. These concepts are similar to those developed in his designs for resource towns in Northern Sweden such as Svappavaara. In 2009, a portion of Ralph Erskine's windbreak building, Ormen Långe was demolished, due to maintenance issues.

Ormen Långe was completed in 1965. It was a long building, around 200m long, that provided housing for workers of the LKAB mining operations. The building was designed to protect the town from harsh winds.

The iron-apatite ore of the Svappavaara mine is hosted in igneous rocks known as the Kiruna Porphyry.
