= Northland Resources =

- Type: Public
- Traded as: OSE: NAUR; FWB: NPK; OTC Pink: NRSRF
- Industry: Mining (exploration and development
- Founded: 1997
- Headquarters: Luxembourg
- Key people: Anders Hvide (Executive Chairman), Karl-Axel Waplan(CEO)
- Products: Iron ore
- Website: www.northland.eu

Northland Resources S.A., also known as Northland, was a publicly traded exploration and development mining company. It focused on iron ore bearing properties located in the northern regions of Sweden and Finland. The company had two principal projects: the Kaunisvaara iron concentrate project in Sweden, and the Hannukainen (IOCG) project in Finland. The projects are primarily located within the Pajala shear zone, in the northern Baltic Shield (also sometimes called the Fennoscandian shield ).

The company declared bankruptcy on 8 December 2014.

== Development stage projects ==
The Kaunisvaara Project is the company's first development project. It is located in Sweden and is expected to be a near-term producer of high-grade iron ore concentrate, consisting of 69% Fe. Mining began in the first quarter of 2012, with the first shipment of iron ore concentrate to market in February 2013. The operation is expected to yield 5 million tonnes per year of iron ore concentrate. A plan to finance further exploration and failed, however, on February 4. Following the failure to place bonds and equity, the project and the whole company Northland Resources are expected to go bankrupt. The Swedish subsidiary of the Norwegian Mining Company Northland, Northland Sweden AB, which consists of the Kaunisvaara Mine, filed for bankruptcy on Friday 8th 2013. The parent company Northland Resources which is listed on the Oslo Exchange is, however, still operative. Northland has pre-sold 100% of the Kaunisvaara production via off-take contracts, which will last for at least the first seven years of operation. The company released a Definitive Feasibility Study on the Kaunisvaara Project in September 2010. The study was updated in May 2011.

The second development project in line is the Hannukainen project in Finland. A Definitive Feasibility Study on Hannukainen has commenced and is expected to be completed at the end of 2011.

== History ==
- 1997: Company listed on TSX Venture Exchange as North American Gold Inc. (NAU)
- 2003: Commenced conducting business in Sweden
- 2005: Changed name to Northland Resources Inc.
- 2008: Company's shares were graduated from the TSX Venture Exchange to the TSX
- 2010: Re-domiciled under the laws of Luxembourg on January 18, 2010, and changed name to Northland Resources S.A.
- 2014: Filed for bankruptcy and trading of shares suspended
