= Beowulf Mining =

Exploration and development company

Beowulf Mining plc (formerly Luxmit Limited from 1988–1989, Britcan Minerals plc from 1989–2000, E.Ruby plc from 2000–2001, Alamos plc from 2001–2003 and Beowulf Gold plc from 2003–2005) is a UK registered Nordic focused exploration and development company listed on the AIM in London and Spotlight in Sweden. The CEO is Kurt Budge. The company was formed in 1988 as Beowulf Gold. Through subsidiaries Jokkmokk Iron Mines AB and Fennoscandian Resources, it is active in developing open-pit mining in Sweden and Finland respectively; its plans to mine for magnetite iron ore at Kallak, west of Jokkmokk in northern Sweden, and for graphite in Heinävesi, Finland, are controversial.

== Kallak ==
The company's main focus since the early 2010s has been the Kallak mine in Jokkmokk Municipality. Beowulf Mining's Swedish subsidiary, Jokkmokk Iron Mines, has conducted exploratory mining for iron ore at sites in northern Sweden. These plans are opposed by environmental groups, nature tourism companies and the Sami people, while the company says their operations and the Sami's traditional reindeer herding can "coexist". The company argues that exploitation of the Kallak North and South sites will both directly and indirectly benefit the contracting economy of Jokkmokk Municipality. Opponents of the mining project also argue that longer-term investments in the area are better for job creation: the company had promised the creation of almost 400 jobs for 14 years, whereas a tourist centre in nearby Sarek National Park could create 500 jobs. Opponents also cite dangers from mining in the area including the railroad used to supply the mining operation, one local herdsman saying that trains on the local line had killed up to 1,200 reindeer. Protests took place at the site in 2013, culminating in August in dozens of protesters digging themselves in. Two had tied themselves to pipes, and at one point protesters delayed test blasting by sitting in trees. All were removed by local police.

In 2013, Jokkmokk Iron Mines applied for a permit for Kallak to start a 103 ha (250-acre) open-cast mine with a production of 10 million tons of iron ore per year and a 14-year operating time. The impacted area, e.g. by roads, the building process and the residuals of the mining is estimated to be up to 1,500 ha (3,700 acres). The licensing authority Länsstyrelsen Norrbotten refused to grant the permit in 2017 finally, citing the serious consequences for indigenous reindeer herding, as the mine divides pasture areas and migration routes. This means that there is a risk for local reindeer herders that it will become impossible to keep reindeers. This contrasts with the opinion of the state authority Bergstaten, which considers the granting of the licence to be legal. As a consequence of the different views of the two authorities, the decision lies with the Swedish government. The Swedish Greens used to be the force holding back the Kallak project. However, as they left the governmental coalition in late 2021, the allowance for mining project started to be reconsidered, with Swedish prime minister Magdalena Andersson expressing the opinion that Sweden needs more mines. In February 2022 advisors of the U.N. Human Rights Council and protests opposing it were held by local Saami population backed by Greta Thunberg. Despite the resistance, the mine got governmental approval on March 22, 2022. The approval included a list of conditions that the mining project needs to meet before it starts and it still has to win the approval of the Swedish environmental court.

One issue in the conflict is lack of Sami ownership of the land and a lack of protection of their indigenous rights; Sweden, unlike Norway, has not signed on to an international treaty protecting those rights. The Sami Parliament of Sweden responded to the Kallak project in August 2013 with a statement against further exploitation of Sápmi (Lapland) for mineral extraction. Beowulf Mining has been ranked as one of the worst oil, gas, and mining companies on indigenous rights and resource extraction in the Arctic.

== Heinävesi graphite mining project ==
On 24 January 2019 the Beowulf Mining's Finnish subsidiary's CEO Rasmus Blomqvist announced that the graphite mining project is postponed by years because of the mining project's significant impact on the environment. The graphite mining project in Heinävesi has been facing major concerns by the local community. Fennoscandian Resources, was granted an exploration permit by the Finnish Safety and Chemicals Agency in 2016 for graphite mining in Heinävesi. The project has been opposed by local residents, by politicians including MEP Petri Sarvamaa and also by the Finnish Association for Nature Conservation as the site is close to the Saimaa nature preserve. Lintula Holy Trinity Convent has expressed fears the project will endanger the herb cultivation on which it depends for income. A municipal initiative against the mining project was signed by over 3000, with over 800 residents. The Regional Council of South Savo reports of a concern towards the mining project on Heinävesi's Aitolampi. The regional strategy for South Savo raises the purity of waterways and the attractiveness of tourism to the top objectives of the region. The open pit mining in the vicinity of major waterways and valuable natural environments is a high risk to Saimaa's tourist livelihood and the natural values, and thus contradict the objectives of the regional strategy.

== Other sites ==
In 2006 the company was granted an exploration permit for a deposit of iron and titanium at Ruoutevara near Kvikkjokk, also in Jokkmokk Municipality. In 2010 they planned to build a processing plant there and use it to also process iron ore from Kallak. In 2013 they announced they would not renew the exploration permit for the site because of inadequate infrastructure and concerns which had been expressed about potential impact on Sarek National Park.

Through a joint venture with Energy Ventures, Wayland Copper, Beowulf Mining is also active at Ballek, in Arjeplog Municipality, where it conducted exploratory operations for mining copper in 2013 and expanded them in 2014.
