= Norwegian State Railways rolling stock =

Vehicles operated by Norwegian State Railways

Norges Statsbaner (NSB) operates as of 2023 21 locomotives, 282 multiple units and 137 passenger carriages.

== Current stock ==
=== Locomotives ===
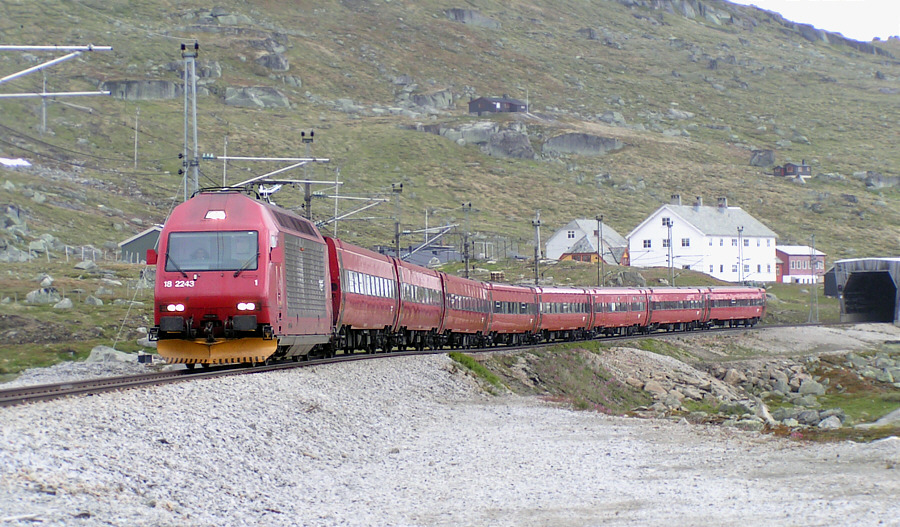
NSB El 18 with the express train at Finse on the Bergen Line

- 5 Di 4 class diesel locomotives, used mostly on the Nordland Line.
- 16 El 18 class electric locomotives, used on all main electrified lines.

=== Electric multiple units ===
- 38 Class 69 with 2-car or 3-car commuter trains, used around Oslo, Bergen and Arendal.
- 6 Class 70 with 4-car intercity (medium distance) trains, used around Oslo.
- 36 Class 72 with 4-car commuter trains, used around Oslo and Stavanger.
- 14 Class 73 with 4-car long-distance trains, used on Bergen Line, Dovre Line and Sørland Line.
- 6 Class 73b with 4-car intercity version of the BM73 used on Østfold Line.
- 52 Class 74 trains used for short regional services.
- 83 Class 75 trains used for long commuter services.
- 14 Class 76 with 6-car trains used for commuter services around Trondheim, and on the Røros Line.

== Numbering ==
The first letter combination of the type defines the category of stock.

- El: Electric locomotive
- Di: Diesel locomotive
- Skd: Shunter tractor
- BM: Multiple unit

The numbers following the letters are the series. For the El and Di locos, they are numbered chronologically from when they were ordered by NSB. For multiple units, electric units are numbered starting with 62 and diesel starting at 83. Following the series number is the road number, unique for each stock. This number has three or four digits.

== Livery ==
Traditionally NSBs electric and diesel locomotives and carriages were painted green, but in the 1970s this was replaced with red. Shunters were given a yellow color with red cabs. During the late 1990s and 2000s a new color scheme was introduced with multiple colors. Express trains were painted blue and silver, regional trains red and silver while local trains became green and silver. The freight trains were moved to the subsidiary CargoNet and painted grey, the Airport Express Train was painted silver and while the tourist railway Flåmsbana got green trains.

== Locomotives ==
Locomotives
Image	Model	Number	In service	Use	Power	Top speed	Note
	El 1	24	1922-66	Universal	690 kW	70 km/h	
	El 2	2	1923-67	Universal	857 kW	75 km/h	
	El 3	10	1925-67	Ofotbanen		60 km/h	
	El 4	15	1926-65	Ofotbanen	2,088 kW	60 km/h	
	El 5	12	1927-72	Universal	1,044 kW	70 km/h	
	El 6	1	1911-56	Rjukanbanen		45 km/h	
*	El 7	2	1911-56	Rjukanbanen		45 km/h	
	El 8	16	1940-87	Universal	2,080 kW	110 km/h	
	El 9	3	1947-89	Freight	712 kW	60 km/h	
*	El 10	17	1931-99	Shunter	515 kW	45 km/h	
	El 11	41	1951-98	Universal	1,676 kW	105 km/h	
	El 12	8	1954-92	Ofotbanen	2,398 kW	75 km/h	
*	El 13	37	1957–2003	Universal	2,648 kW	100 km/h	
*	El 14	25	1968-	Universal	5,082 kW	120 km/h	Transferred to CargoNet. 11 remain in service. To be replaced by new electric locomotives that return electricity to the grid when braking.
*	El 15	6	1967-96	Ofotbanen	5,406 kW	120 km/h	Transferred to Malmtrafikk, and sold to Sweden's Hector Rail in 2004 where they served until 2019. In 2020 they were sold to Grenland Rail, Norway where 4 locomotives remain in service.
*	El 16	15	1977-	Universal	4,440 kW	140 km/h	Transferred to CargoNet in 2002
	El 17	12	1981-2014	Passenger	3,000 kW	150 km/h	Scrapped 2015/16
	El 18	22	1996-	Passenger	5,400 kW	200 km/h	16 remain in service
	Di 1	1	1942-59	Universal	1,472 kW	100 km/h	
	Di 2	54	1954-2012	Shunter	441 kW	80 km/h	
	Di 3	35	1957–2000	Universal	1,305 kW	143 km/h	
	Di 4	5	1980-	Passenger	2,450 kW	140 km/h	
*	Di 5	17	1985-96	Shunter	485 kW	60 km/h	Used DB V260
*	Di 6	6	1996- 2012	Universal	2,650 kW	160 km/h	Returned to builder. 3 Now operated by private Norwegian company Cargolink
*	Di 7	1	1993-96	Shunter	1,235 kW	100 km/h	Used SJ T44
	Di 8	20	1996-	Freight	1,570 kW	120 km/h	Transferred to CargoNet, 5 remain in service.

== Multiple units ==
Multiple units
Image	Model	Number	In service	Cars	Use	Capacity	Power	Top speed	Note
	Class 62	4	1931-70	1	Branch lines	73	344 kW	50 km/h	
	Class 64	3	1936-85	1	Hardanger Line; Flåm Line	38	464 kW	50 km/h	
	Class 65	49	1936-85	3	Commuter rail Branch lines		464 kW	70 km/h	
	Class 66	4	1945-77	3	Branch lines	170	731 kW	120 km/h	
	Class 67	18	1953-95	3	Commuter rail Branch lines		468 kW	70 km/h	
	Class 68	30	1956–2001	3	Commuter rail Branch lines		640 kW	100 km/h	
	Class 69	85	1971-	2/3	Commuter rail	178-306	1,218 kW	130 km/h	39 currently in service, phasing out.
	Class 70	16	1992-	4	InterCity Express	230	1,720 kW	160 km/h	6 remain in service
	Class 71	16	1998-	3	Airport Express Train	168	2,646 kW	210 km/h	Transferred to Flytoget
	Class 72	36	2002-	4	Commuter rail	310	746 kW	160 km/h	
	Class 73	20	1997-	4	Bergen Line; Dovre Line; Sørland Line; Østfold Line	204-243	3,538 kW	210 km/h	
	Class 74	52	2012-	5	Southern Norway	216	4,500 kW	200 km/h	Stadler FLIRT, short regional version
	Class 75	83	2012-	5	S-Bahn traffic in the Oslo area	235	4,500 kW	200 km/h	Stadler FLIRT, long local version
	Class 76	14	2021-	6	Trøndelag Commuter Rail Dovre Line			200 km/h	Stadler FLIRT, electric-diesel bi-mode
	Class 83	4	1932-63	1	Voss Line; Skreia Line		224 kW	75 km/h	
	Class 86	38	1938-96	2	Commuter rail Branch lines	48-70	312 kW	100 km/h	
	Class 87	25	1941-81	1	Branch lines	59	93 kW	75 km/h	
	Class 88	6	1942-70	2/3	Branch lines	157	970 kW	120 km/h	
*	Class 89	5	1981-89	1	Flekkefjord Line	47	153 kW	115 km/h	Used SJ Y7
	Class 91	10	1954-86	2		64	312 kW	100 km/h	
	Class 92	14	1984-2021	2	Trøndelag Commuter Rail; Røros Line	90-114	714 kW	140 km/h	Trains donated to Ukraine. Replaced by new Class 76.
	Class 93	15	2001-	2	Nordland Line; Rauma Line; Røros Line	90	592 kW	140 km/h	Bombardier Talent
	Y1	2	2000 - 2015	1	Bratsberg Line		294 kW	130 km/h	Used SJ Y1
