= T44 =

T44 may refer to:

== Weapons and armour ==
- T-44, a Soviet tank
- 57 mm Gun Motor Carriage T44, a self-propelled gun
- T44 rifle, an American prototype rifle

== Other uses ==
- T44 (classification), a disability sport classification
- Allison T44, an American turboprop engine
- Beechcraft T-44 Pegasus, an American trainer aircraft
- CCF-Brill T44, a Canadian trolley bus
- SJ T44, a Swedish locomotive
- T44 RNA
