= T46 =

T46 may refer to:

- T46 (classification), a disability sport classification
- T-46 (tank) a Soviet tank
- Fairchild T-46, an American jet trainer aircraft
- SJ T46, a Swedish locomotive
- Slingsby T.46, a British glider
