= Skreia =

Village in Østre Toten Municipality, Norway

- Village
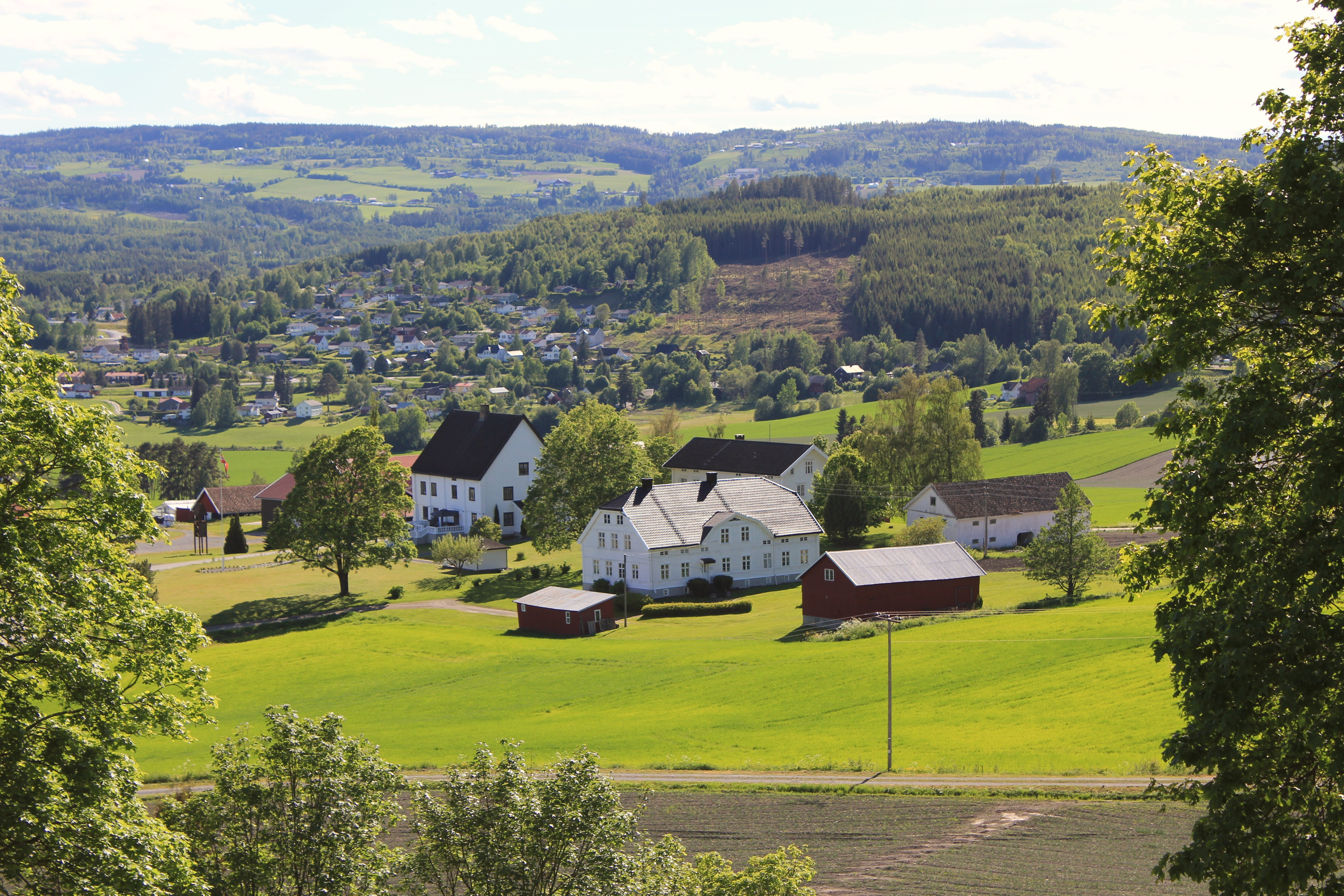
- View of the village
- Interactive map of Skreia
- Location within Innlandet Location within Norway
- Coordinates: 60.65257°N 10.93564°E
- Country: Norway
- Region: Eastern Norway
- County: Innlandet
- District: Toten
- Municipality: Østre Toten Municipality

Area
  - Total: 1.22 km^{2} (0.47 sq mi)
- Elevation: 153 m (502 ft)

Population (2024)
  - Total: 1,036
  - Density: 849/km^{2} (2,200/sq mi)
- Time zone: UTC+01:00 (CET)
  - Summer (DST): UTC+02:00 (CEST)
- Post Code: 2848 Skreia

Skreia is a village in Østre Toten Municipality in Innlandet county, Norway. The village is located on the western shore of the large lake Mjøsa, about 7 kilometres (4.3 mi) southeast of the village of Lena and about 8 kilometres (5.0 mi) to the south of the village of Kapp. In the summers, there is a ferry from Skreia across the lake to the town of Hamar.

The 1.22-square-kilometre (300-acre) village has a population (2024) of 1,036 and a population density of 849 inhabitants per square kilometre (2,200/sq mi).

Skreia was the terminus of Skreiabanen railway line. The now-abandoned railway line once ran between Reinsvoll and Skreia. The single track rail was a branch line from the main Gjøvik Line and it closed in 1987.

Skreia is located along County Road 33 which runs between Bjørgo in Nord-Aurdal and Minnesund in Eidsvoll. The Ostre Toten Cultural Center (Østre Toten kulturhus) is located in Skreia. The principal local industry is food production and the processing of potatoes and vegetables.

== Notable people ==
- Alv Gjestvang, a speed skater
- Inger Lise Rypdal, a singer
- Maj Britt Andersen, a singer
- Sander Eitrem, a speed skater

== Media gallery ==
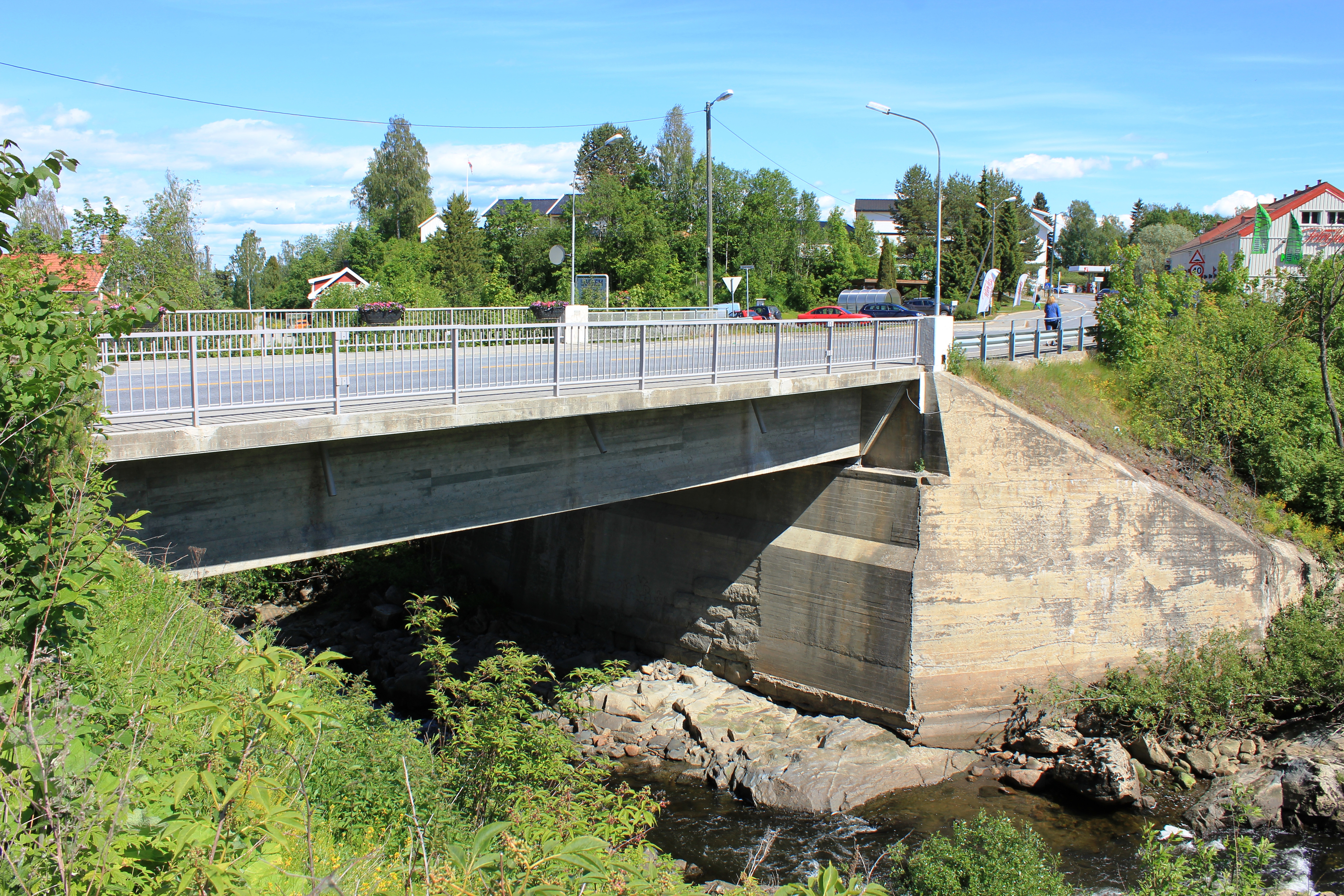
Skreia Bridge

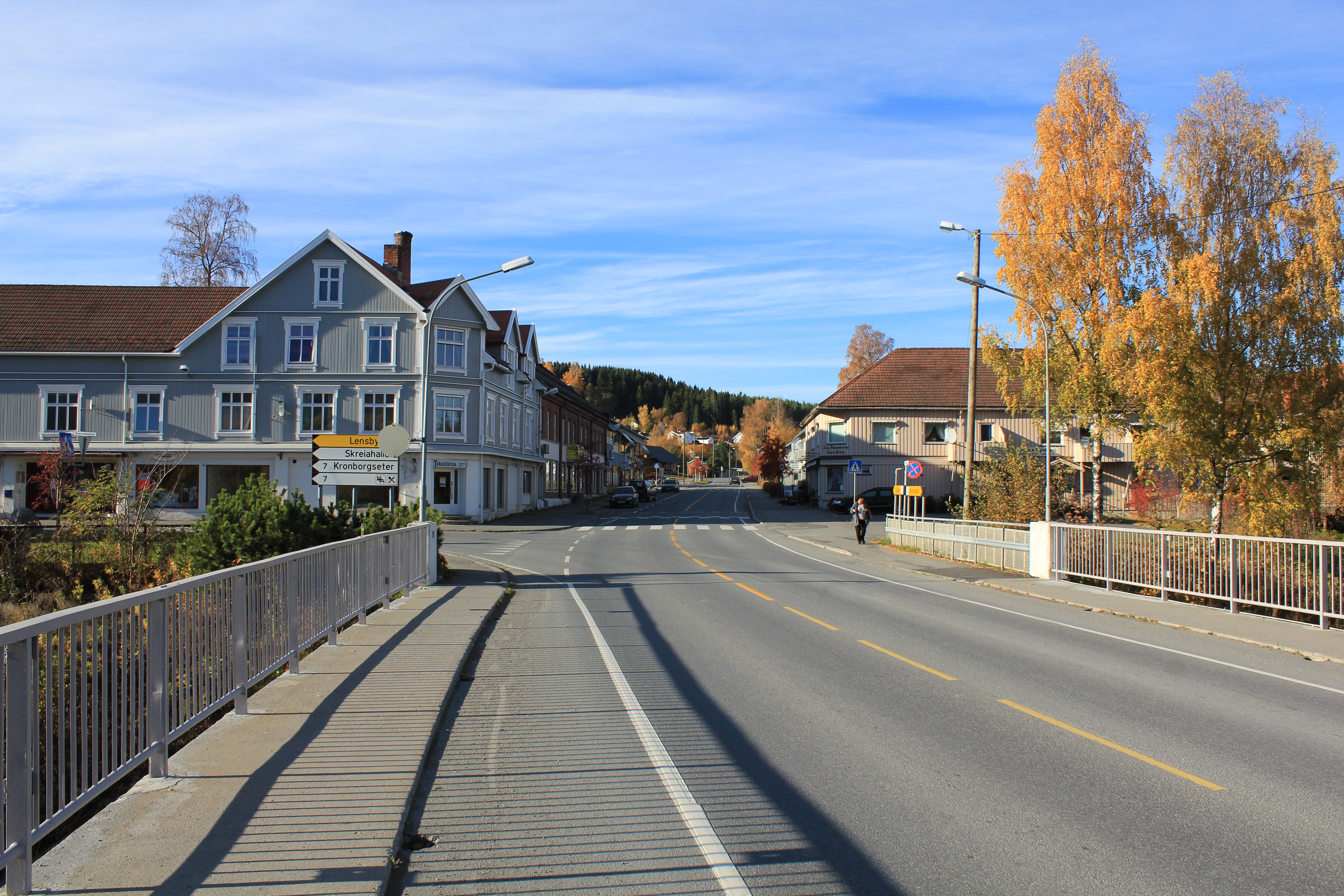
Skreia Main Street

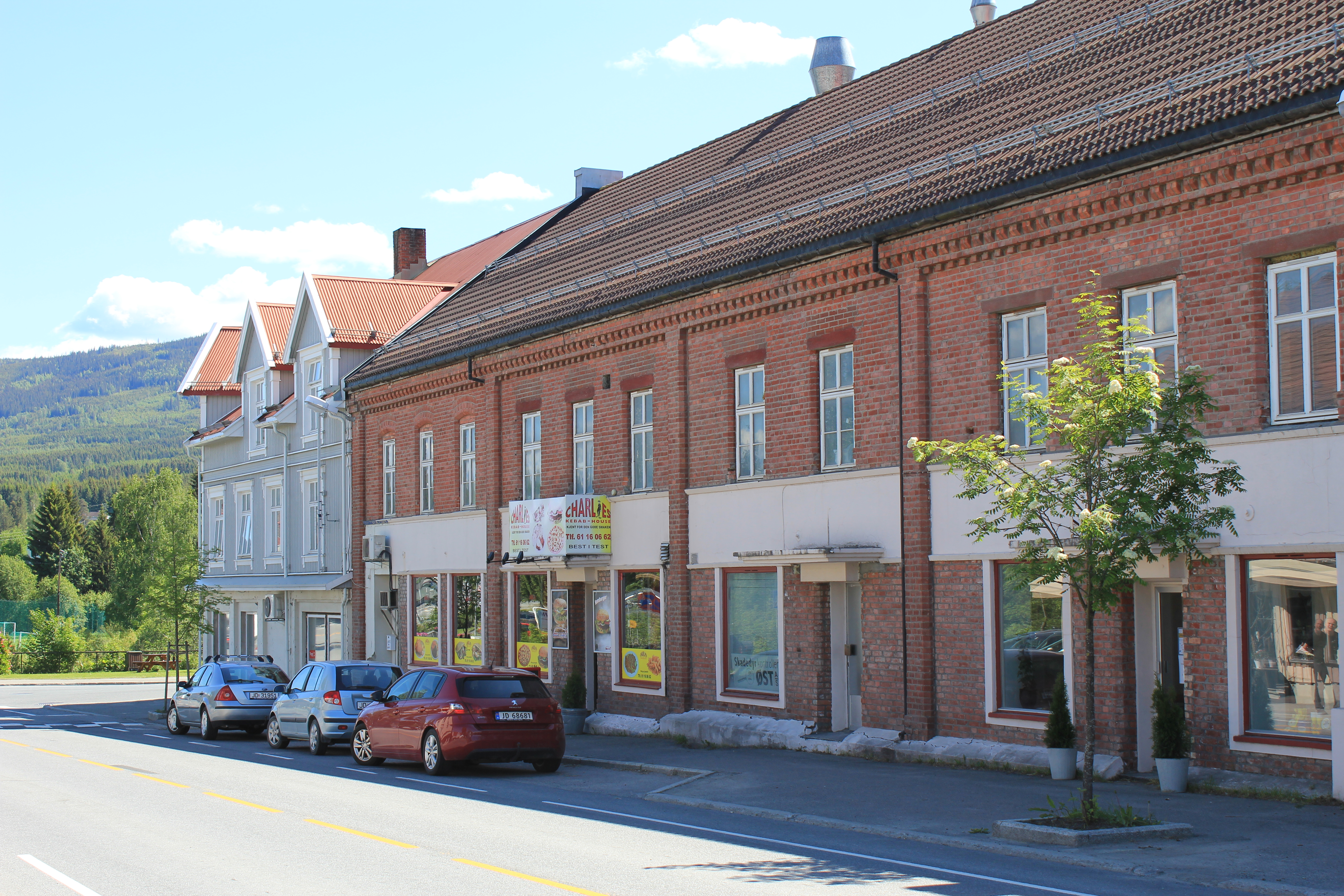
Center of Skreia

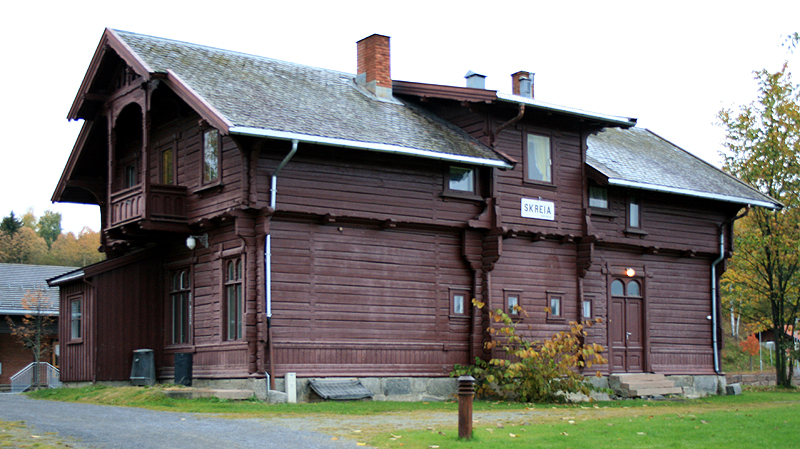
Skreia Railway Station

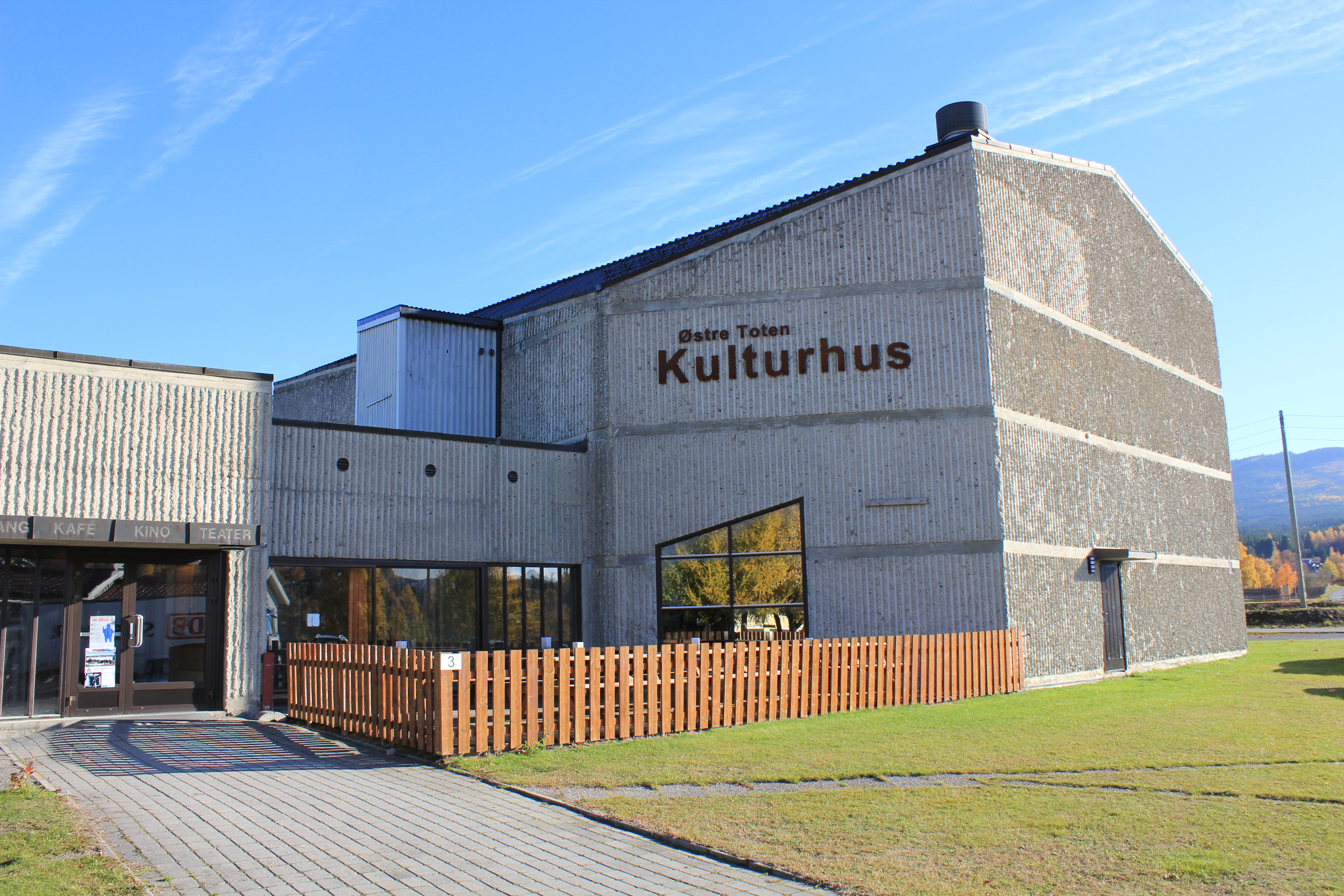
Østre Toten Cultural Center
