= NSB Class 83 =

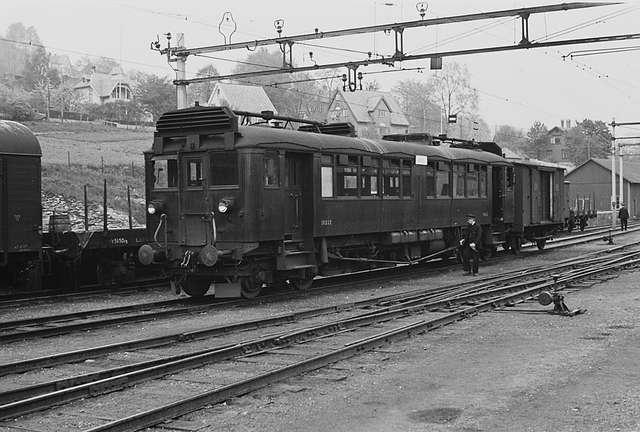
- One of the three units at Voss Station in 1939
- In service: 1932–1961
- Manufacturer: Skabo
- Constructed: 1932
- Refurbished: 1953–1954
- Number built: 3
- Fleet numbers: 18 236–238 (–1956); 83.36–38
- Operators: Norwegian State Railways
- Lines served: Voss Line; Skreia Line

Specifications
- Car length: 11,260 mm (36 ft 11.3 in)
- Maximum speed: 75 km/h (47 mph)
- Weight: 34.5 t (34.0 long tons; 38.0 short tons)
- Prime mover(s): Deutsche Werke; Hercules
- Power output: 224 kW (300 hp) (Deutsche Werke); 290 kW (390 hp) (Hercules)
- Track gauge: 1,435 mm (4 ft 8 1/2 in)

NSB Class 83 (Norwegian: NSB type 83) were a class of three gasoline and later diesel railcars built by Skabo Jernbanevognfabrikk for the Norwegian State Railways. Delivered in 1932, they were originally equipped with two Deutsche Werke prime movers giving a combined power output of 224 kilowatts (300 hp).

The trains were initially stationed in Bergen and used on the Voss Line, the westernmost part of the Bergen Line, mostly on the commuter train from Bergen to Nesttun. From the 1940s the trains were used less, first because of rationing of gasoline and later because of lack of spare parts. They received new diesel prime movers from Hercules in 1953 and 1954. The Voss Line was electrified in 1954 and the railcars were relocated to the Skreia Line. One returned to the Bergen Line from 1957. They were taken out of use in 1960 and 1961 and were retired in 1963. All three were scrapped.

== History ==
The first multiple units used on the Voss Line was a Class 1 units, which had been delivered in 1923. The next class of multiple units was Co-m Class 3. The three units were built by Skabo in Oslo, using a transmission system from Triebwagenbau-Aktiengesellschaft and a prime mover from Deutsche Werke. The bodies were built by Skabo and received a similar design to the electric Class 62. The series was delivered on 6 March, 13 April and 7 June 1932, respectively. The trains were numbered 18236 through 18237.

The trains were put into service on the commuter rail service between Bergen Station and Nesttun Station, the most heavily trafficked part of the Voss Line. Along this segment the trains had sufficient power to haul cars totaling ten axles. At first they hauled wooden Co no. 966–970 cars, later light metal cars built for Class 86. In the operating year 1938–39 they ran an average distance of 67,757 kilometers (42,102 mi). With the break-out of the Second World War rationing on fuel was introduced and the trains were used only about an eighth of normal. At least one of the units received a braking cord, allowing it to be used as an ordinary carriage.

The situation did not improve much after the war. The prime movers were in constant need of repairs and spare parts were scarce, and most of the time no more than one of the units was in revenue service. They were taken out of service in April 1951 and the district asked that new prime movers be delivered before they be taken back into use. NSB's board approved this and new Hercules prime movers were installed. Unit 823 completed it retrofitting on 21 November 1953. The other two received the upgrade on 9 April and 10 June 1954, respectively.

The Voss Line was electrified on 2 July 1954. Bergen District received five Class 65 for the local traffic, and the Class 83s were sent to Oslo District. There they were mostly used on the Skreia Line. The units were renumbered on 3 June 1956, becoming Class 83. They received numbers 83.36 through 83.38. The latter returned to Bergen in January 1957, but sent back to Eastern Norway during the summer. A few months later 83.36 was sent back to Bergen. It was put into service on the run through Raundalen which runs east of Voss Station. However, the unit was too heavy for the gradients and was little used because of faults. A Class 91 took over the run in 1961, with the 83-unit as a reserve. It was retired on 15 October 1962. The units on the Skreia Line were taken out of service on 1 January 1961 and were finally retired on 27 April 1963. All three units have been chopped.

== Specifications ==
The units were railcars capable of hauling carriages as a multiple unit. They originally had two Deutsche Werke gasoline prime movers, each with an effort of 112 kilowatts (150 hp) for a total power output of 224 kilowatts (300 hp). They had a fuel tank capable of 480 liters (110 imp gal; 130 U.S. gal). With their original fuel usage of 1.6 liters per kilometer, they could run 300 kilometers (190 mi) before needing to be refueled. They later received two Hercules DFXH-F diesel prime movers, each rated at 145 kilowatts (194 hp), which increased their power output to 290 kilowatts (390 hp).
