= Hector Rail =

Swedish freight rail company

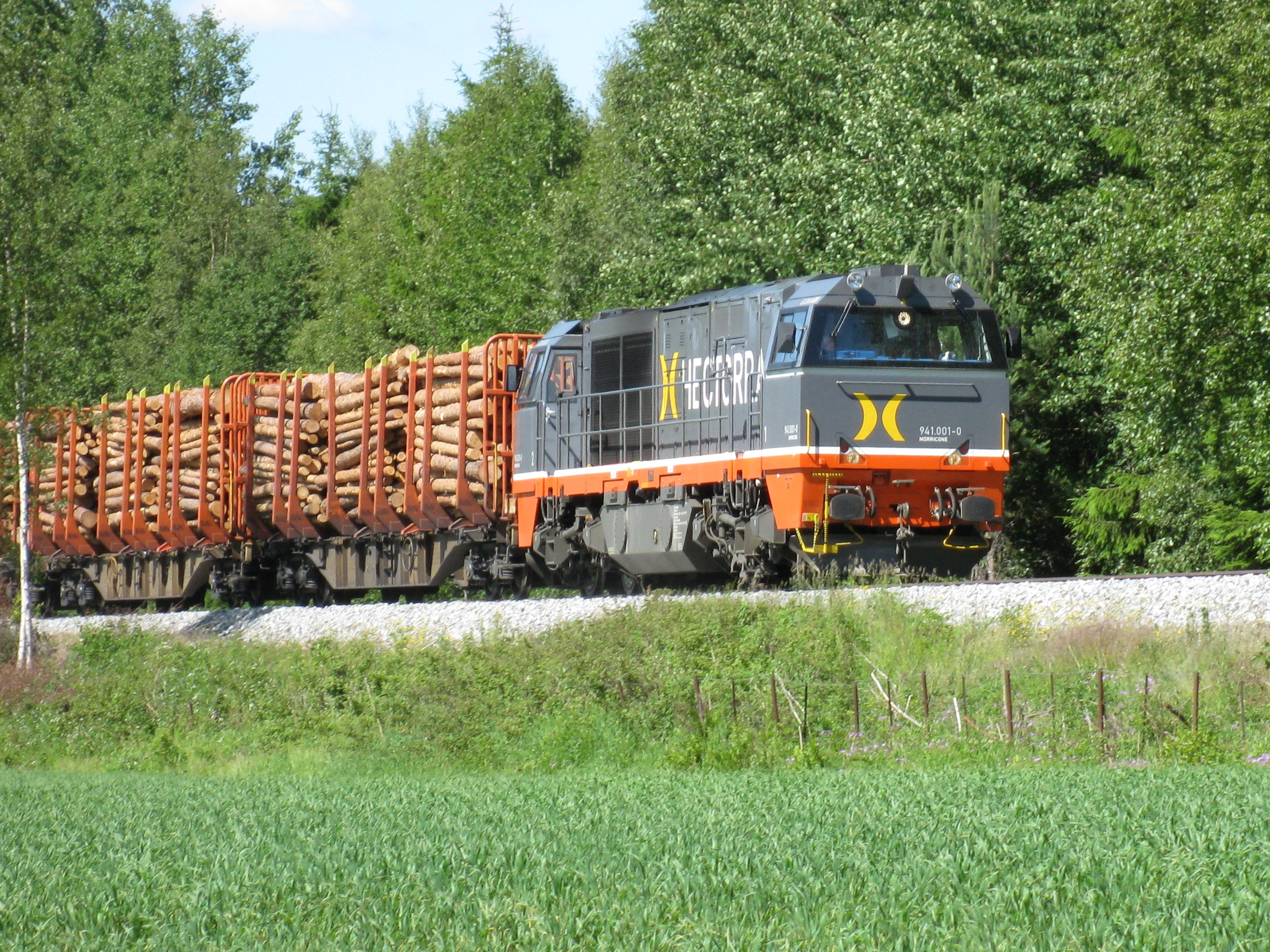
A Hector Rail Class 941 hauled lumber train on the Solør Line in Norway

Hector Rail is a Swedish-based independent train haulage provider. It operates in the European rail transport market and possesses its own rolling stock, including a fleet of 100 locomotives. The company provides both locomotives and drivers to freight customers who need to have whole unit trains hauled between two places with a regular timetable.

Hector Rail operated its first train on 12 December 2004 shortly after its establishment. Four years later, Hector Rail formed a long term partnership with the Dutch logistics company Samskip to operate direct rail freight services between Scandinavia and the rest of Europe. In 2009, Hector Rail hauled its first passenger service. In September 2014, the company was acquired by the Swedish global investment organization EQT Infrastructure II, at which point the company fleet comprised roughly 50 locomotives and 10 shunters. During 2016, Hector Rail strategically aligned with the British freight operator GB Railfreight (GBRF) following its acquisition by EQT AB; it was sold four years later. In late 2019, Hector Rail, in partnership with several other companies, launched the Coevorden-Nässjö rail freight service between the Netherlands and Sweden. During May 2021, Hector Rail began operating train services for FlixTrain within Sweden. In early 2023, Hector Rail provided traction for a new international freight service between Sweden and Italy.

== History ==
In 2004, Hector Rail was founded. At its establishment, the majority of the shares in the company were held by the Høegh family of Norway through Höegh Capital Partners. On 12 December of that year, Hector Rail ran its first train; early operations were focused on the transportation of heavy goods between Sweden and Norway. By 2007, the company operated roughly five million train-km per year in Sweden and Norway. During January 2008, Hector Rail began operating in Denmark, it also ran its first trains between Sweden and Germany that year. Hector Rail formed a long term partnership with the Dutch logistics company Samskip to operate direct rail freight services between Scandinavia and the rest of Europe; the frequency of these services would rise over the following decade, reaching six round trips per week between Sweden and Germany alone. During 2009, Hector Rail hauled its first passenger service, doing so on behalf of Veolia.

In September 2014, the company was acquired by the Swedish global investment organization EQT Infrastructure II. At the time of its acquisition, Hector Rail had roughly 190 employees operating across Sweden, Norway, Denmark and Germany, a fleet comprising roughly 50 locomotives and 10 shunters, and had recorded revenues of approximately SEK630 million ($89.2 million) during the previous year. The company was reorganised over the following twelve months; the subsidiary company Hector Rail GmbH was established in 2015 as part of its plans to expand operations into the wider European market.

During 2016, Hector Rail took ownership of the British freight operator GB Railfreight (GBRF) following its acquisition by EQT AB. During October 2019, EQT AB completed the sale of GB Railfreight to Infracapital, ending the British freight company's association with Hector Rail. In June 2020, EQT agreed terms for the sale of Hector Rail to Ancala Partners LLP; at the time of the transaction, it was the largest privately owned rail freight operator in Scandinavia, having a fleet of over 100 locomotives.

Between 2016 and 2019, Hector Rail operated Blå Tåget between Gothenburg-Stockholm-(Uppsala) on behalf of Skandinaviska Jernbanor. During August 2017, the Swedish mining company LKAB signed a new haulage contract with Hector Rail covering a five year period. In late 2019, Hector Rail partnered with Samskip, Skane Rail, and Euroterminal Coevorden to the Coevorden-Nässjö rail freight connection between the Netherlands and Sweden. During the late 2010s, various measures were explored and enacted by Hector Rail to improve operational efficiency and bolster its environmental credentials of its services.

During May 2021, Hector Rail began operating train services for FlixTrain when they launched their services in Sweden. During October 2022, Hector Rail cooperated with Samskip to launch a new intermodal freight service between the Baltic port of Rostock and the city of Duisburg. In early 2023, Hector Rail provided traction for a new international freight service between Sweden and Italy.

== Locomotives ==
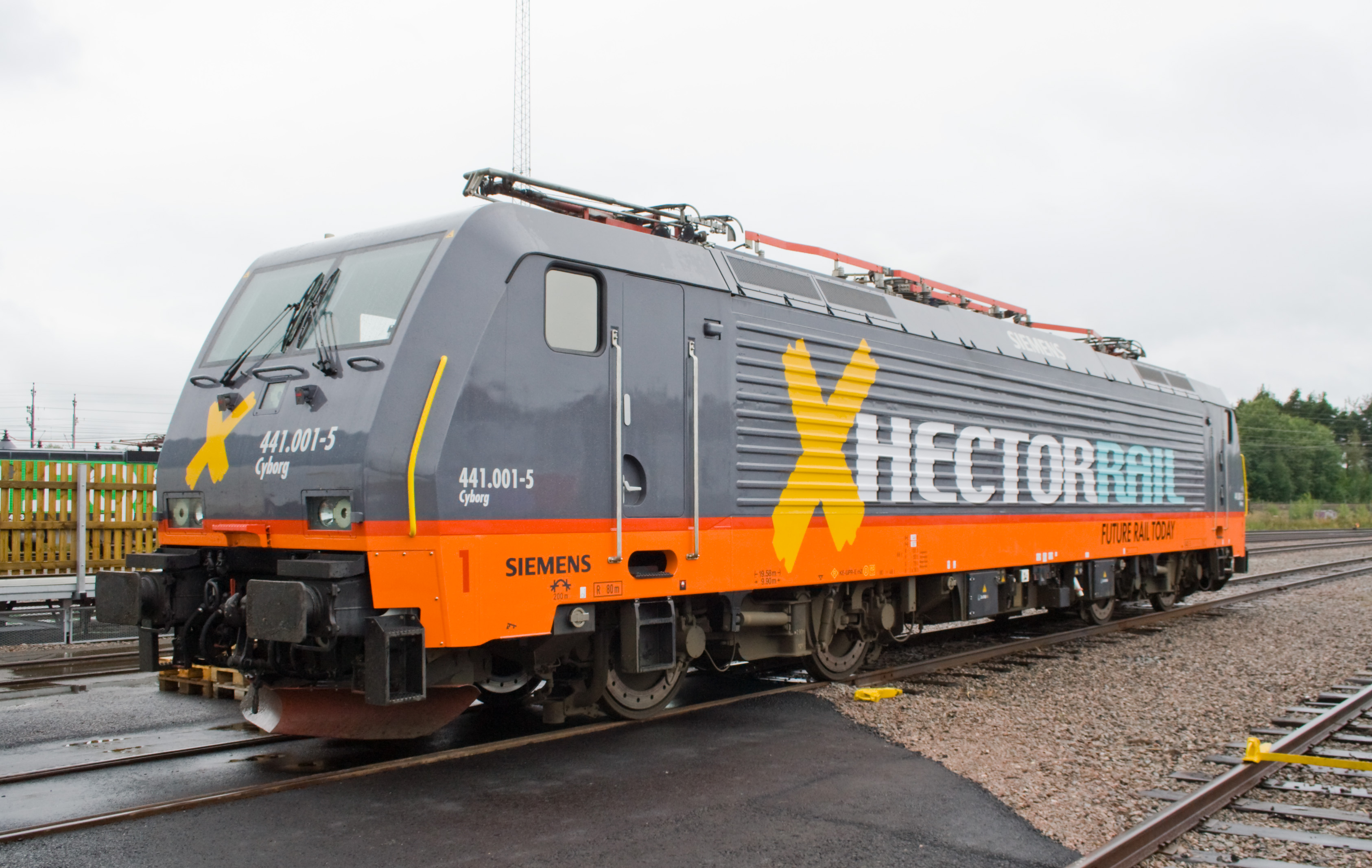
Hector Rail Class 441, the EuroSprinter

The company operates diesel and electrically powered locomotives:

- 5 Class T66, a mix of former Rush Rail and Belgian-sourced locomotives. Owned by Beacon Rail.
- 3 Class 141, ex ÖBB Class 1012 prototype locomotives (currently out of service due to poor reliability)
- 12 Class 142, ex ÖBB Class 1142 locomotives, 11 in operation
- 8 Class 143, ex SJ Rc3 locomotives
- 12 Class 241, Bombardier TRAXX locomotives
- 8 Class 242, Siemens' ES64U2 EuroSprinter locomotives
- 20 Class 243, Siemens Vectron locomotives
- 2 Class 441, Siemens' ES64F4 EuroSprinter locomotives
- 4 Class 841, NOHAB diesel locomotives ex SJ T43
- 3 Class 921, diesel shunting locomotives ex SJ Z70
- 2 Class 941, Vossloh G 2000 BB diesel locomotives
- 2 Class 942, MaK 1205 diesel locomotives

The first digit indicates the number of different electrical voltages supported, but 8 for diesel-electric and 9 for diesel-hydraulic. The second digit is the number of axles, hinting the tractive effort.

Hector Rail previously owned 6 Class 161, ex NSB El 15 locomotives, but they were taken out of service in 2019 after deliveries of new Class 243 "Vectron" locomotives and were sold in 2020 to the Norwegian company Grenland Rail.

== In Media ==
The railway was featured in a 2018 episode of Mighty Trains, showing newly acquired Vectron locomotives hauling lumber from northern Sweden to the Ostrand pulp mill in Timrå, Sweden.
