= SJ T46 =

T46
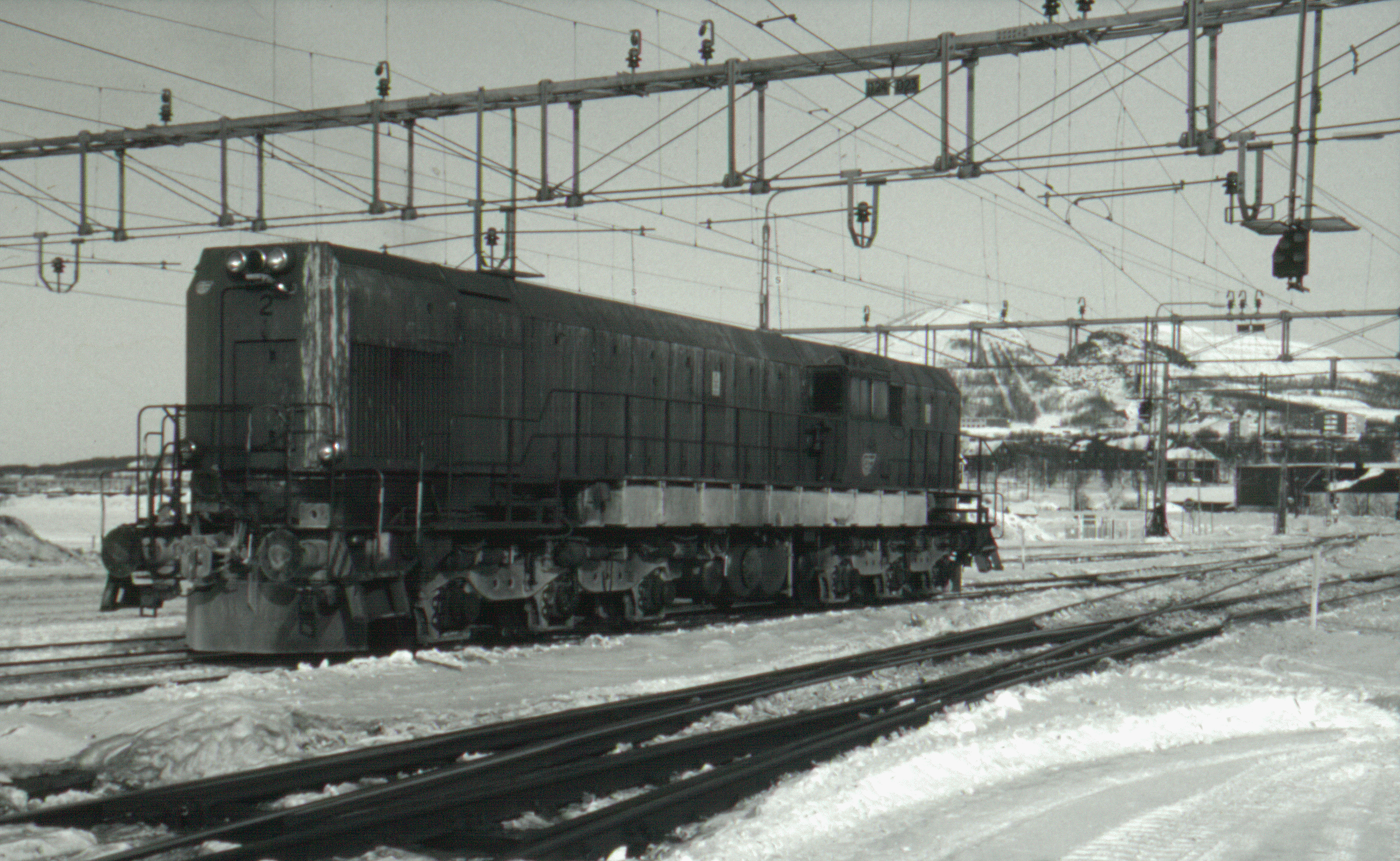
- MTAB T46-2
Type and origin
- Power type: Diesel-electric
- Builder: NOHAB
- Build date: 1973-1974
- Total produced: 4
Specifications
- Configuration
  - UIC: Co′Co′
- Gauge: 1,435 mm (4 ft 8 1/2 in)
- Wheel diameter: 1,015 mm (39.96 in)
- Length: 18,640 mm (61 ft 1 7/8 in)
- Loco weight: 150 t (150 long tons; 170 short tons)
- Transmission: Electric
Performance figures
- Maximum speed: 100 km/h (62 mph)
- Power output: 1,235 kW (1,656 hp)
- Tractive effort: 310 kN (70,000 lb_{f})
Career
- Operators: MTAB
- Numbers: 1 - 4

The SJ Class T46 is a diesel-electric locomotive used by Malmtrafik for shunting at Kiruna in Sweden. Four locomotives were built by Nyquist & Holm (NOHAB) as upgrades versions of T44 in 1973–1974. The T46 features more powerful engines and six, Co′Co′, instead of four axles. It is the most powerful diesel locomotive used in Sweden. The locomotives are still in use, and three of the engines were supposed to be upgraded in 2007, but the company that was rebuilding them went bankrupt. LKAB's own workshops at Notviken rebuilt all four of the T46 locomotives by 2013.
