= NSB El 4 =

Class of Norwegian electric locomotives

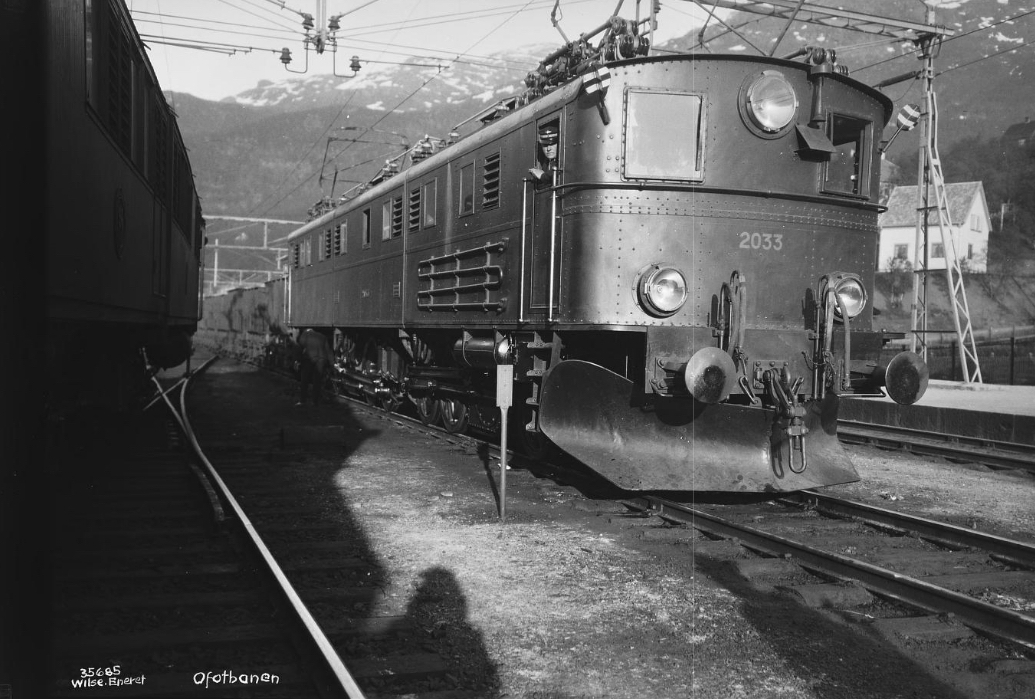
Type and origin
- Power type: Electric
- Builder: NEBB/Thune/Hamar
- Build date: 1925–1929
Specifications
- Configuration
  - UIC: 1′C+C1′
- Length: 19.6 m (64 ft 3.7 in) (triple)
- Loco weight: 134.5 tonnes (132.4 long tons; 148.3 short tons)
- Electric system/s: 15 kV 16.7 Hz catenary
- Current pickup: Pantograph
Performance figures
- Maximum speed: 60 km/h (37 mph)
- Power output: 2,088 kW (2,800 hp)
Career
- Operators: Norwegian State Railways
- Number in class: 5 (triple sections)
- Numbers: 4 2033 – 4 2034; 4 2044 – 4 2046
- First run: 1925
- Disposition: Replaced by NSB El 15 from 1960s

NSB El 4 was a class of electric locomotive used by the Norwegian State Railways (NSB) to transport iron ore on the Ofoten Line. NSB had a total of five triple-locomotive sets.

== History ==
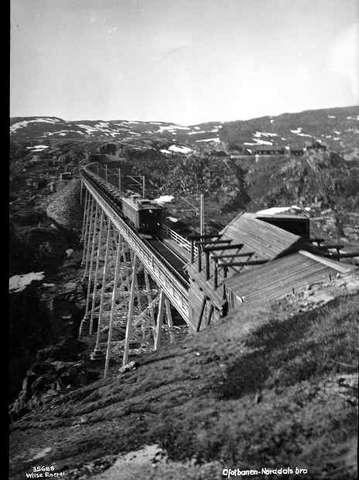
El 4-hauled train on the Norddal Bridge in 1930

In 1923, Ofoten Line and the Swedish Iron Ore Line were electrified and NSB had to acquire electric locomotives to haul the trains. NSB chose to order five double-engine El 3 units and five triple-engine El 4 units for the purpose. The El 4 were built at NEBB, Thune and Hamar Jernstøberi.

After World War II, the production of iron ore in Kiruna and Malmberget increased dramatically and the train length was increased, with the consequence that each train needed more propulsion. NSB chose to order eight new El 12 locomotives at the same time it combined the ten El 3 locomotives to make three triple-engine sets with one reserve.

When the El 15 locomotives were delivered in 1967, the El 3 and El 4 units were taken out of service. None of the locomotives have been preserved. One engine, 4.2046, is buried under gravel and soil below the railway near Katterat, where it ended up at a derailment in 1959. Heavy rainfall had caused flooding that damaged the line in Sørddalen. 4.2046 was hauling an inspection train when the embankment that carried the track failed and the engine tipped over. Usable parts were stripped from the engine before it was buried when the embankment was rebuilt.
