= SJ T43 =

Swedish diesel-electric locomotive class

T43
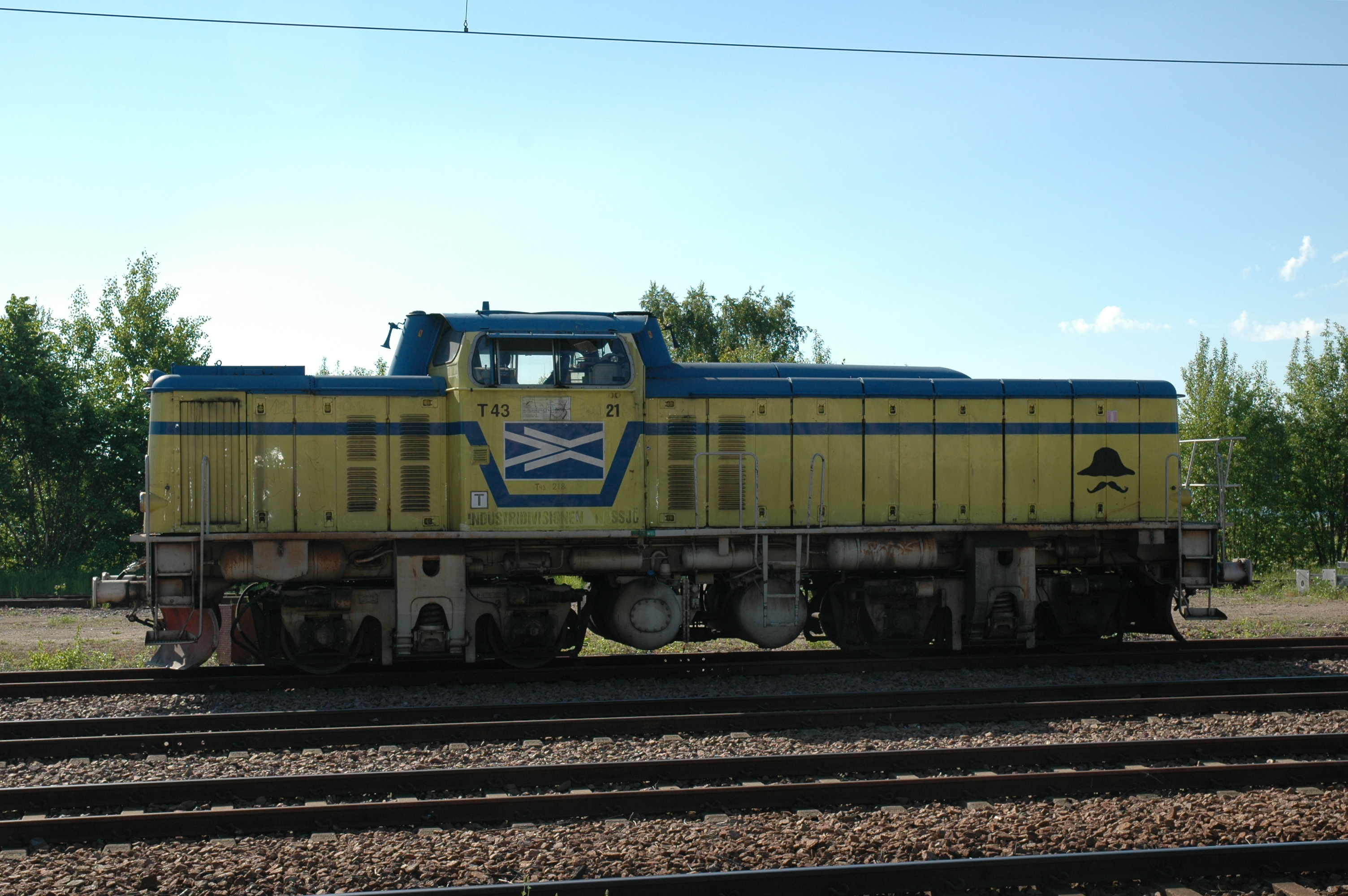
- A Banverket T43 in Sandviken 2010
Type and origin
- Power type: Diesel-electric
- Builder: NOHAB
- Build date: 1961-1963
- Total produced: 50
Specifications
- Configuration
  - UIC: Bo′Bo′
- Gauge: 1,435 mm (4 ft 8 1/2 in)
- Wheel diameter: 1,015 mm (39.96 in)
- Length: 14,240 mm (46 ft 8 5/8 in)
- Loco weight: 72 t (71 long tons; 79 short tons) tare weight
- Prime mover: EMD 12-567C
Performance figures
- Maximum speed: 90 km/h (56 mph)
- Power output: 1,065 kW (1,428 hp)
- Tractive effort: 210 kN (47,000 lb_{f})
Career
- Operators: Statens Järnvägar
- Numbers: 209 - 258

The SJ Class T43 is a Swedish diesel-electric locomotive originally operated by Swedish State Railways (Swedish: Statens Järnvägar, SJ) and later other companies. It was built by Nykvist & Holm (NOHAB) in 1961–1963, and equipped with Electro-Motive Diesel engines. Eight of the locomotives are equipped with GM's multiple unit capability and be operated with up to three other GM locomotives. They remain in service as shunters for private railway companies.

== History ==
The T43 made it possible to phase out steam locomotives in Sweden, with none left in service there after 1963. Until the mid-1980s the T43 was used on main-line services, both for passenger and freight trains. The main area of passenger service was on Blekingekustbanan. During the late 1980s the successor T44 took over more and more of the T43's duties. SJ took the T43 out of service in the 1990s, though some were transferred to Banverket and TGOJ, who in turn sold them to private railways that used them for freight and shunting services. One was exported to Canada for operation on the Hull–Chelsea–Wakefield Railway, and is currently in storage following the railroad's closure. In 2000, a T43 was repainted into a Great Northern livery for the movie Dancer in the Dark.
