= NSB El 3 =

Class of Norwegian electric locomotives

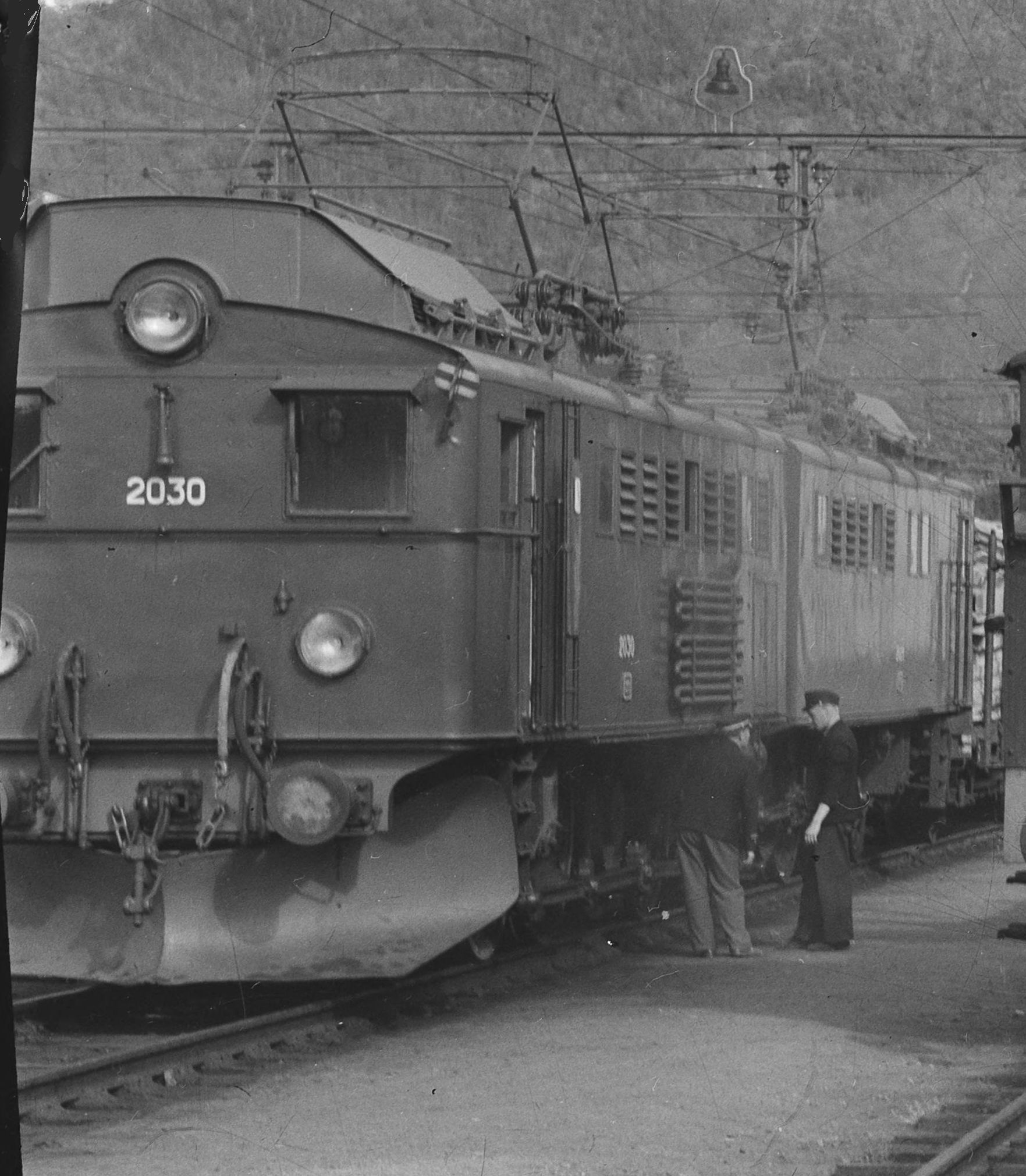
Type and origin
- Power type: Electric
- Builder: Thune; Hamar Jernstøberi; Siemens; AEG
- Build date: 1925 and 1929
Specifications
- Configuration
  - UIC: (1′C)+(C1′)
- Gauge: 1,435 mm (4 ft 8 1/2 in) standard gauge
- Length: 21.1 m (69 ft 2 3/4 in) (double)
- Loco weight: 138.3 tonnes (136.1 long tons; 152.4 short tons)
- Electric system/s: 15 kV 16.7 Hz Catenary
- Current pickup: Pantograph
Performance figures
- Maximum speed: 60 km/h (37 mph)
Career
- Operators: Norwegian State Railways
- Number in class: 10
- Numbers: 3 2025 – 3 2032; 3 2047 – 3 2048
- First run: 1925

NSB El 3 was an electric locomotive used by the Norwegian State Railways (NSB) to transport iron ore on the Ofoten Line. Five twin-locomotive sets were in service from 1925 to 1967.

== History ==
The Swedish part of the ore line, the Iron Ore Line, was electrified in 1915 but Norway kept using steam locomotives until the Norwegian electrification in 1923. As Norwegian traction the El 3 was chosen along with five triple-engine El 4 units. Eight El 3 were built with delivery on August 9, 1925, two more on October 19, 1929. The El 3 and El 4 had about the same characteristics and used for the same purpose and ordered simultaneously; choosing two models like this is atypical for railway companies because of higher maintenance costs.

By 1922 SJ had placed an order on the new Of-locomotives, yet NSB chose to base the El 3 on the older Oe. Build by ASEA, they were equipped with quill drive and regenerative braking; the latter only caused problems though, excessively increasing the current that caused damage. They only served on the Norwegian lines until 1949, after which they were where put into through trains to Kiruna. In 1950 LKAB decided to increase the mine output, requiring trains now to haul 3,100 tonnes (3,051 long tons; 3,417 short tons). In 1953-54 the locomotives were rebuilt to three triple-engine sets and supplemented with eight El 12. When LKAB chose to increase train weights more in the late 1960s, NSB responded with the order of the El 15. All El 3 and El 4 units were taken out of service with the delivery in 1967, none being preserved.
