= Ofoten Line =

Railway line in Narvik, Norway

Coordinates: 68.4°N 17.5°E

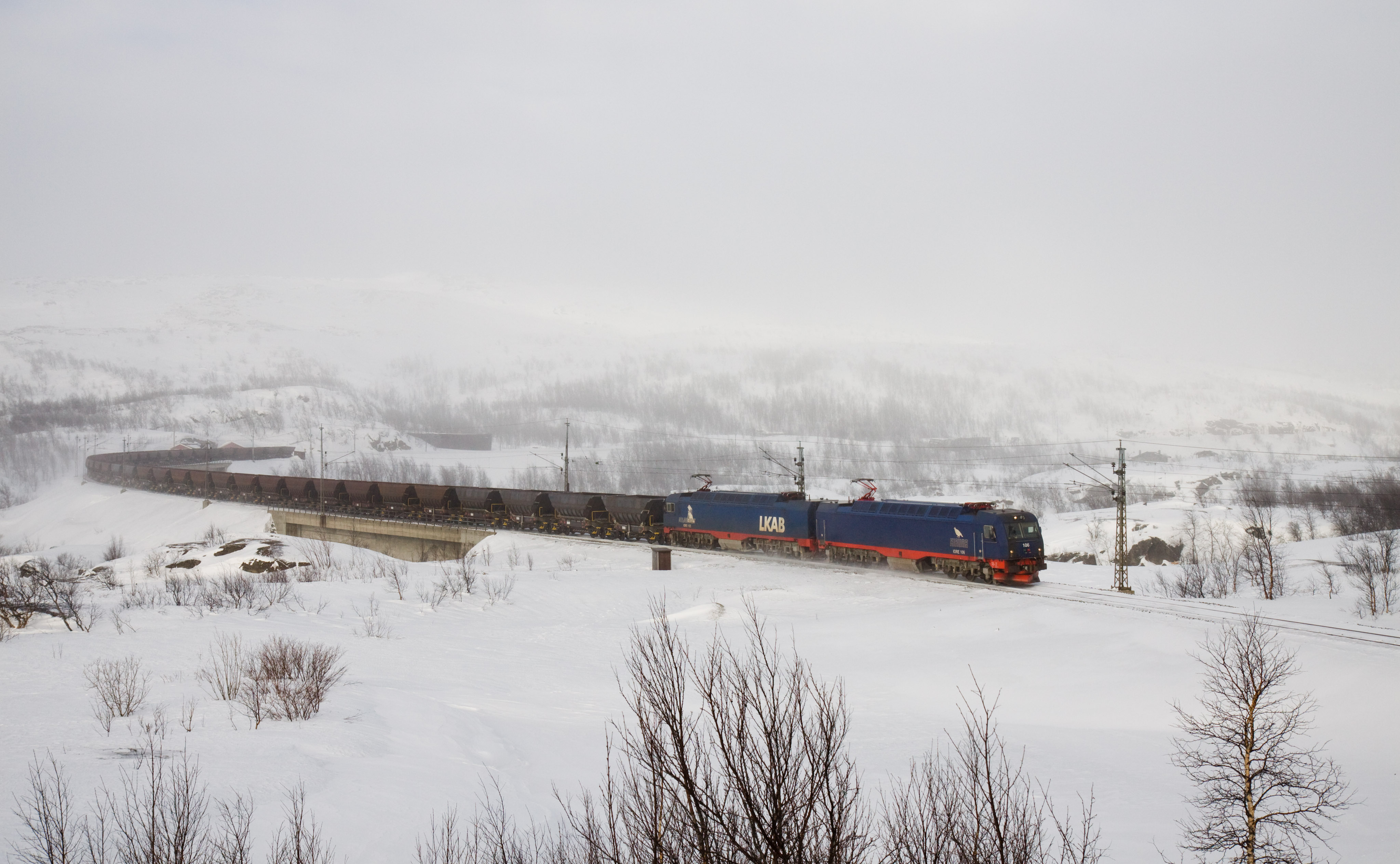
- Malmtrafik train hauled by twin Iore locomotives

Overview
- Native name: Ofotbanen
- Owner: Bane NOR
- Termini: Port of Narvik; Riksgränsen
- Stations: 7

Service
- Type: Railway
- System: Norwegian railway network
- Operator(s): CargoNet; Malmtrafikk; SJ; Arctic Train

History
- Opened: 15 November 1902

Technical
- Line length: 43 km (27 mi)
- Number of tracks: Single
- Character: Freight
- Track gauge: 1,435 mm (4 ft 8 1/2 in)
- Electrification: 15 kV 16.7 Hz AC
- Highest elevation: 513 m (1,683 ft)

The Ofoten Line (Norwegian: Ofotbanen) is a 43-kilometre (27 mi) railway line in Narvik Municipality, Norway. It runs from the Port of Narvik to Riksgränsen on the Norway–Sweden border, where the line continues as the Ore Line via Kiruna and Gällivare to Luleå. The Ofoten Line is single track, electrified at 15 kV 16.7 Hz AC and has seven stations. The line only connects to the rest of the Norwegian railway network via Sweden. The main traffic is up to 12 daily freight trains operated by Malmtrafik that haul iron ore from Sweden to Narvik. In addition, CargoNet operates container trains, branded as the Arctic Rail Express (ARE), and SJ operates passenger trains, including a night train to Stockholm.

Construction of the Ofoten Line started in 1898 along with the Ore Line from Riksgränsen to Kiruna. They were completed in 1902, allowing LKAB to haul ore from their mines in Kiruna to the ice-free Port of Narvik. Operation and ownership of the line was held by the Norwegian State Railways. The line was electrified in 1915 and Norwegian State Railways (NSB) started using El 3 and El 4 locomotives. During World War II, the ore traffic stopped because of the Battles of Narvik and the bombing of the town. In the following decades, NSB introduced El 12 and El 15 locomotives. In 1996, operation of the ore trains was taken over by Malmtrafik, which was controlled by and now is a subsidiary of the mining company LKAB. The same year, ownership of the railway line was transferred to the newly created Norwegian National Rail Administration. The line has been upgraded to 30 tonnes (30 long tons; 33 short tons) axle loads, allowing the new Iore locomotives to haul 8,600 tonnes (8,500 long tons; 9,500 short tons) trains.

== Operations ==
Malmtrafik operates iron ore trains from the mines in Kiruna, Svappavaara and Malmberget to the Port of Narvik, where LKAB operates an ore port with a capacity of 25 million tonnes per year. Daily there operate 11 to 13 trains in each direction. The trains hauled by Iore have 68 cars, are 750 meters (2,460 ft) long and weigh 8,600 tonnes (8,500 long tons; 9,500 short tons). The full ore trains operate at 60 kilometres per hour (37 mph), while the empty return trains operate at 70 kilometres per hour (43 mph). In 2006, the company hauled 15 million tonnes of ore, constituting the majority of train cargo in Norway, measured in tonnes, although not in tonne-kilometers.

CargoNet operates two daily container trains from Alnabru Terminal in Oslo, Norway, named the Arctic Rail Express (ARE). The trains operate via Sweden and take 27 hours. The trains haul mostly food northbound and fish southbound along a distance of 1,950 kilometres (1,210 mi). DB Schenker launched a competing freight service, between Oslo and Narvik, in January 2010. There is about 0.5 million tonnes of non-ore freight transport on the Ofoten Line each year.

As of April 2026, SJ operates a single daily train from Narvik to Luleå Central Station or Stockholm Central Station. Travel time from Narvik to Kiruna is 3 hours and 1 minute, and travel time to Luleå is 7 hours and 4 minutes.

In 2020 a local summer seasonal passenger service, called The Arctic Train started between Narvik and Bjørnfjell and back. Tickets are sold to general public but cruise ship passengers are a target group.

The railway operation (as distinct from the train operation) is handled by Bane NOR, the Norwegian railway agency. Rules and laws are like other railways in Norway, meaning that train operators must have Norwegian permission and follow Norwegian railway rules even if this railway is short and isolated from other Norwegian railways.

== History ==
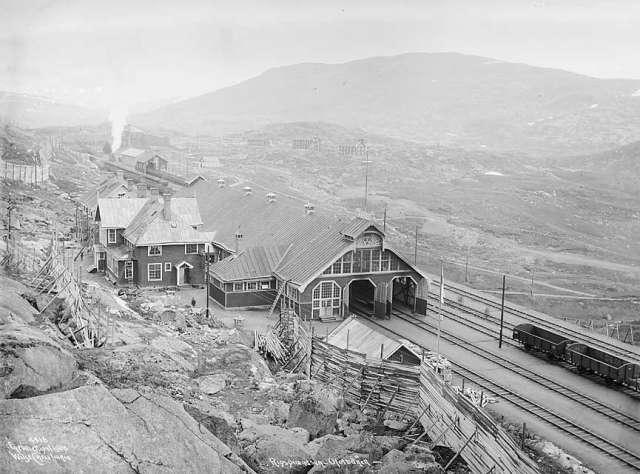
Riksgränsen Station, at 523 metres (1,716 ft) above mean sea level, in 1906

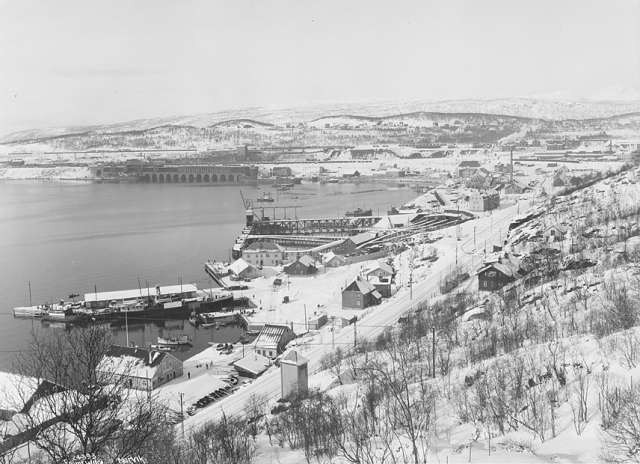
The Port of Narvik in 1924

1884–1979

In 1884, LKAB's predecessor Gellivare Aktiebolag is granted concession for mining in Malmberget. Four years later, the first part of the Ore Line, from Malmberget to Luleå, was completed. In 1889, the mining company filed for bankruptcy, and the Government of Sweden bought the line for 8 million Swedish krona (SEK), half the investment cost. Construction of the Ore Line and Ofoten Line from Gällevare to Narvik started in 1898 and was completed in 1902. A bridge, Norddalsbron, was built along the Ofoten Line, extra long for military reasons, to be able to cut the line in case of war. In 1940, during the war, the bridge was blown up. However, because of lack of explosives, the demolition was not well done, and the bridge could be repaired by the Germans.

On 19 January 1915, the Ore Line between Riksgränsen and Kiruna was electrified. A plan for electrification of the Ofoten Line had been made in 1911, but not until 1920 did parliament approve the plans. Operations with electrical traction started on 15 May 1923, and was officially opened on 10 July. Until 1925, Swedish Oe locomotives were used. NSB decided to order two types of electric locomotive for the line: El 3 and El 4. El 3 was nearly identical to Oe and was a twin unit locomotive with a combined power output of 2,132 kilowatts (2,859 hp). Four twin units were delivered in 1925, and a fifth in 1929. The El 4 locomotives were longer and more powerful, and operated as singles. Each single El 4 had the same power output as a twin El 3. Two units were delivered in 1926, two in 1928 and one in 1929. NSB operated the trains using their rolling stock from Narvik to Abisko, where there was a change of locomotive and operating company.

In 1940, the Port of Narvik suffered extensive war damage, and all export for the remainder of World War II went via Luleå. In 1957, the Government of Sweden bought LKAB. Two of the El 4s were damaged beyond repair during the war.

In 1949, pooling of the locomotives started, whereby NSB and SJ would alternate operating trains and their respective locomotives used on the whole section from Kiruna to Narvik. The following year, LKAB decided to increase annual transport from 8–10, to 12–15 million tonnes. This involved increasing the train weight to 3,100 tonnes (3,100 long tons; 3,400 short tons). To provide sufficient hauling power, the El 3 units were rebuilt from twins to triplets, and two of the El 4 units were made a twin unit. The upgrades were completed by 1953.

At the same time, SJ decided to order a new type of locomotive, the Dm. NSB followed suit, and took order of six locomotives, each with a power output of 2,398 kilowatts (3,216 hp). They were designated El 12 and were delivered in 1954, with another two delivered three years later. The locomotives were at first used as four twin units, but later six were rebuilt to make two triplets.

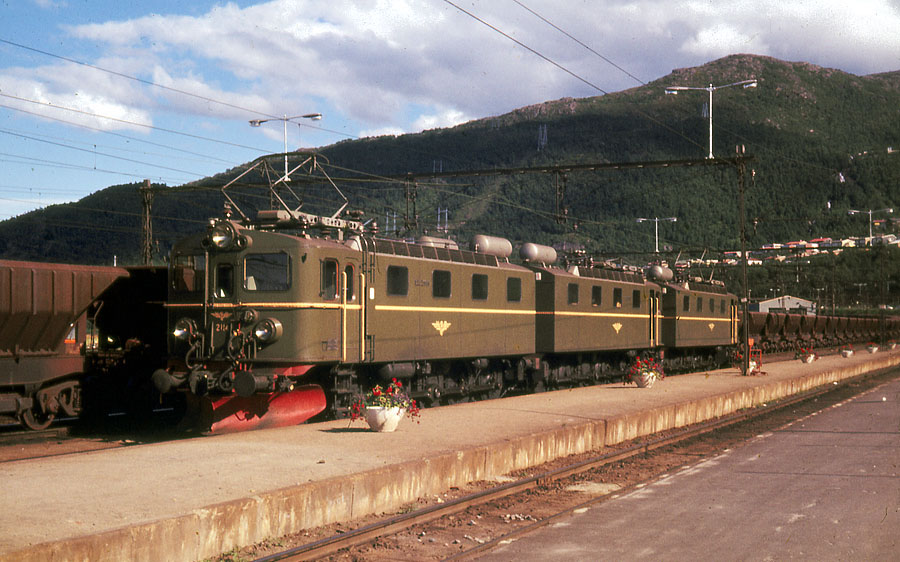
NSB El 12 locomotive hauling an ore train

During the 1960s, LKAB again decided to increase the need for transport, and NSB ordered six El 15, with a power output of 5,406 kilowatts (7,250 hp). Although never permanently coupled together, the units normally operated in pairs when hauling ore trains. The El 4 was used until 1964, and El 3 until 1967. Neither the El 3, El 4 or Oe has been preserved.

1980–1997

In the 1980s, LKAB started to push for lower transport costs. At the time, NSB had a 50% profit margin on the operations, or about NOK 60 to 70 million per year. A committee was established by both countries' transport ministries to find areas of improvement. During the 1970s and 1980s, the number of employees working on the ore logistics had been halved, and NSB stated that they did not believe there was much more room for higher efficiency. El 12 were retired in 1989 and 1990, and one twin unit has been preserved by Ofoten Museum.

In December 1991, LKAB stated that they wanted to take over the operation of the ore trains from NSB and SJ. At the time, they were paying 0.15 Swedish krona (SEK) per tonne kilometer in Sweden and 0.30 Norwegian krone (NOK) per tonne kilometer in Norway, while comparable rates abroad were between SEK 0.03 and 0.10 per tonne kilometer. While SJ had several times during the 1980s agreed to reduce their rates, NSB had not offered the same, and was making a profit of NOK 60 to 70 million per year. LKAB claimed that taking over operations itself could save it SEK 200 million per year. In addition, they stated that they could save between SEK 50 to 100 million in auxiliary fields. LKAB had sent an application to Swedish authorities for permission to take over operations, and had received positive feedback from SJ. NSB, on the other hand, did not support a solution where they did not operate the trains themselves. LKAB stated that if an agreement with NSB could not be reached, they would shift all their transport to the Port of Luleå.

In February 1992, a report ordered by Kiruna Municipality recommended that LKAB, SJ and NSB create a common company to operate the ore trains. At the same time, SJ stated that the consequence of LKAB taking over operation could be that passenger trains on the lines would be terminated. In April 1992, LKAB was awarded traffic rights by the Swedish Rail Administration. The rights also did not affect the Ofoten Line.

The following day, SJ and NSB stated that they were considering establishing a joint venture that would take over the operations of the ore trains. In May, LKAB stated that Norway would, through its membership in the European Economic Area, be required to allow any train operator to run trains on a line, while this was rejected by NSB who stated that this only applied within the European Union, of which Norway was not a member. In late May, NSB stated that they were able to cut costs by 25% and that they would reduce the price to LKAB more than this. LKAB rejected the proposal, and stated that NSB had shown their ability of restructuring too late. By August, SJ and NSB had offered to reduce the price from SEK 650 million to 450 million, but LKAB stated that they believed it was possible to reduce the costs further.

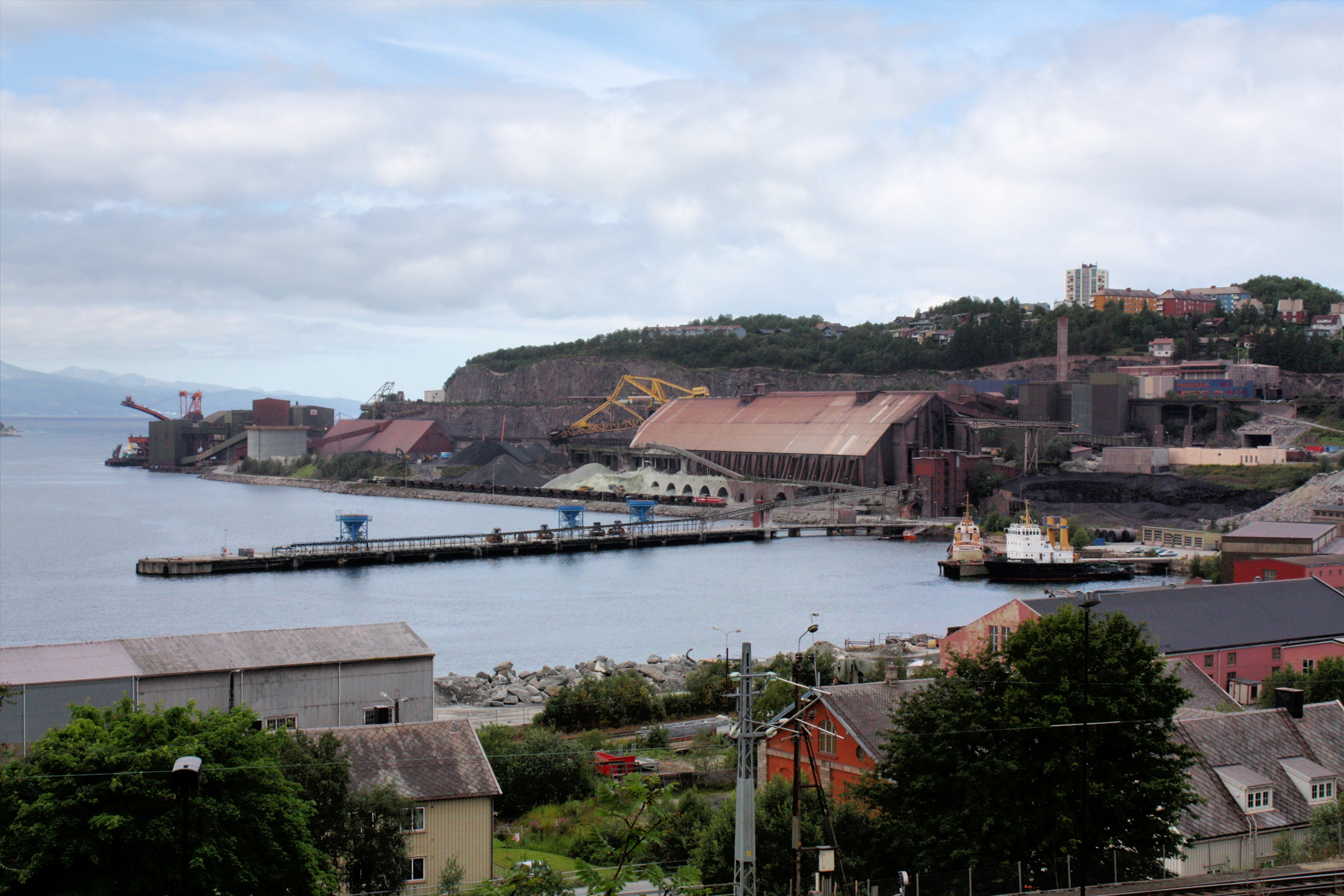
LKAB's facilities at the Port of Narvik

In September, Norwegian Minister of Transport and Communications Kjell Opseth from the Labour Party, stated that it would be "unfortunate" if LKAB should take over the operations. On 18 September, 3,000 people in Narvik held a general strike against LKAB's plans. At the time it was not possible for NSB to fire redundant employees, at that the state agency would have to continue to pay their Narvik employees who would not be hired by LKAB, should the latter take over operations.

In October the Swedish Ministry of Communications gave the final permission for LKAB to take over operations in their own right. On 26 October, SJ and NSB signed a new five-year contract with LKAB where the latter would purchase transport services from the two state railway. The annual price had then been reduced from SEK 650 to 400 million. The price reduction would mean that both NSB and SJ would have to lay off employees.

In 1993, SJ and NSB started operating the Arctic Rail Express (ARE) from Oslo to Narvik via Sweden and the Ofoten Line. Originally the service had two weekly services. The main products were fruits and vegetables northbound and fish southbound. The service moved the northernmost container train service in Norway 250 kilometres (160 mi) north, from Fauske on the Nordland Line. ARE met protests from politicians in Salten, who feared less transport on the Nordland Line.

In 1993, the state railways were losing money on the ore trains. In January 1994, SJ and NSB stated that they were going to merge the operations of the Ore Line and the Ofoten Line. In May 1994, LKAB applied for traffic rights on the Ofoten Line. This was rejected in December by the Norwegian Ministry of Transport and Communications, who stated that the company did not meet the criteria in the law, including that the applicant had to have rail transport as their main activity.

In January 1995, it was proposed that a joint venture would be created between LKAB, SJ and NSB. The Norwegian Union of Railway Workers protested the proposal, and the Norwegian Centre Party stated that their feared this was the first step into converting NSB to a limited company. By February the negotiations were in a deadlock, and SJ and NSB stated that they were issuing an invitation to tender for a new class of locomotives. In March, LKAB again applied for permit to operate their own trains in Norway and stated that they would only join a joint venture if they were the majority owner. On 8 June, LKAB established a Swedish and a Norwegian subsidiary dedicated to rail transport. This would bypass the rationale provided by the Ministry of Transport in denying them traffic rights, and LKAB stated that there was no way the Norwegian authorities now could deny them such rights, given EU Directive 91/440.

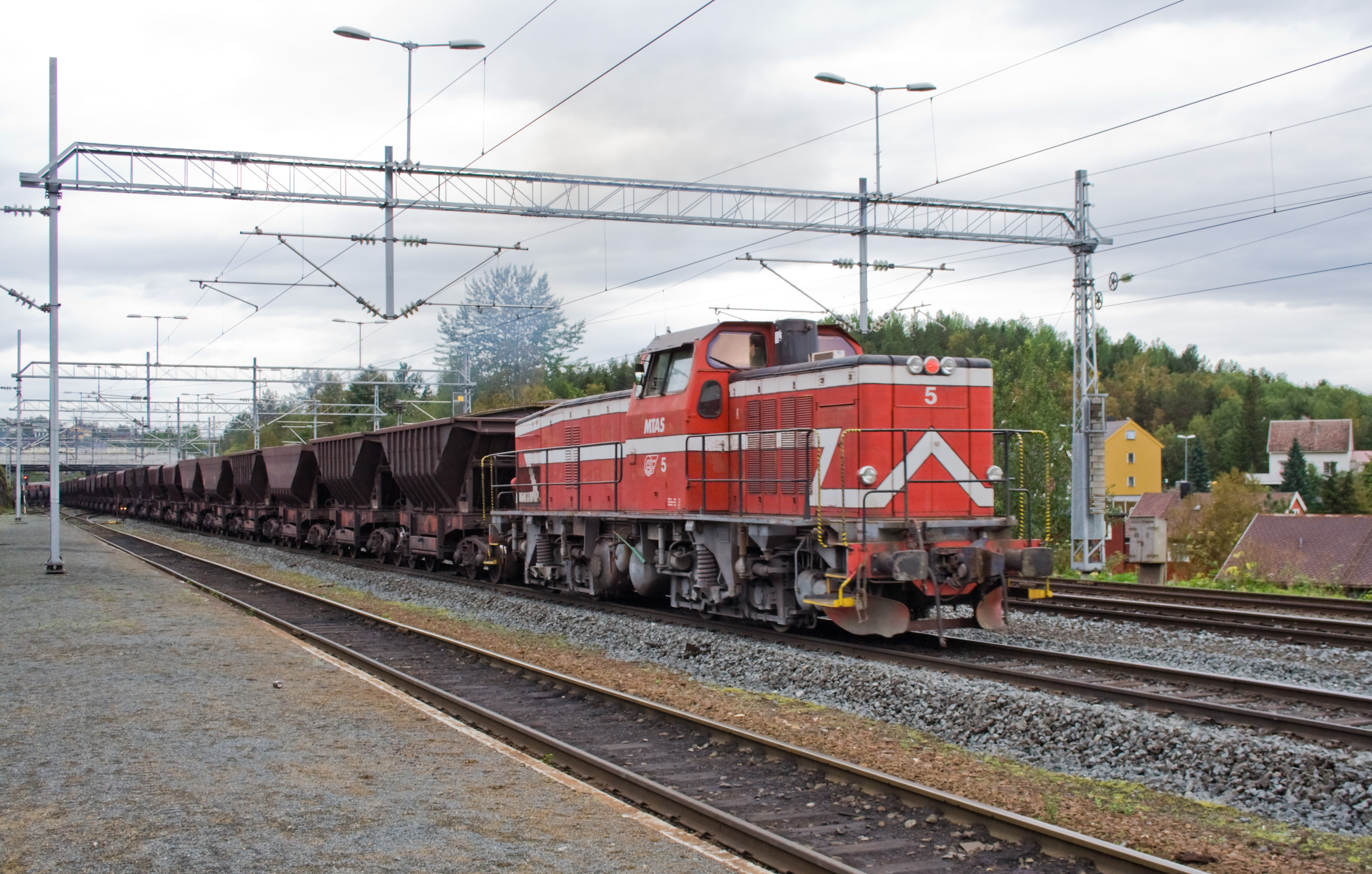
T44 locomotive shunting ore cars at the Port of Narvik

On 27 June 1995, LKAB, SJ and NSB reached an agreement where the three would establish a joint venture owned 51% by LKAB and 24.5% each by NSB and SJ. At the time there were 350 employees in the three companies involved in the transport, and the new company would recruit its employees among these, although it would need significantly fewer employees. The plans called for the new companies taking over operations from 1 January 1996. The organization was protested by local labor unions in Narvik. In December, Kjell Opseth created a committee under the ministry, led by State Secretary Torstein Rudihagen of the Labour Party, which would look at the reorganization, thus postponing the date of the start of operations. In late January, the committee concluded that LKAB met the criteria to receive traffic rights. The report also showed that 55 jobs would be lost in Narvik and that the Norwegian Railway Inspectorate had concerns regarding the safety of LKAB's operations.

In May 1996, Opseth stated that the Norwegian Government would give the necessary rights to the joint venture. At the same time, the state would give Narvik Municipality economic support and lots for commercial development. With Malmtrafik's take-over, 50 employees, equally distributed between the two countries, became redundant. On 28 June, the transfer of operations was finalized when the Labour Party, the Conservative Party and the Progress Party voted in the Parliament of Norway, with 67 against 45 votes, to grant Malmtrafik the necessary rights. The Centre Party, the Christian Democratic Party, the Socialist Left Party, the Liberal Party and the Red Electoral Alliance voted against. NSB's workshop and depot were to be transferred to a new company, Norsk Verkstedindustri, which was intended to create new jobs in Narvik.

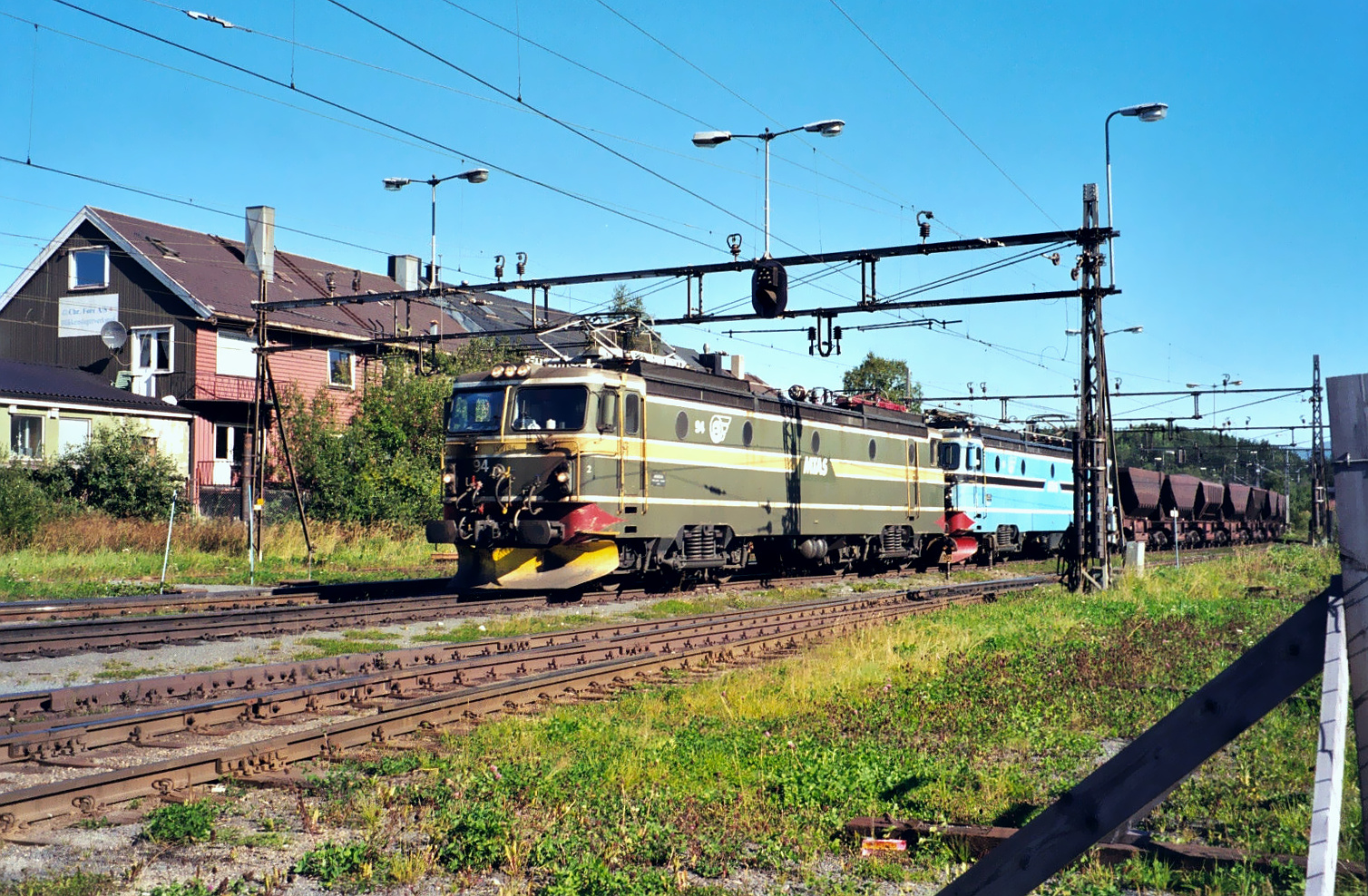
Two El 15 locomotives hauling an ore train near Narvik

Malmtrafik took over operations from 1 July 1996. The company bought the Dm3-locomotives from SJ, NSB's six El 15 locomotives, and a number of workshops, depots and shunters. Post-nationalization, it became the first private railway company in Europe to haul international freight trains. From 26 September to 27 October 200 employees in Narvik were on strike regarding the transition rules for employees. While the strike lasted, there was increased shipments to Luleå.

1998–

In 1998, LKAB estimated a gradual 35% increase in production until 2005, and demanded that the track owners grant sufficient funding to upgrade the lines from 25-tonne (25-long-ton; 28-short-ton) to 30-tonne (30-long-ton; 33-short-ton) maximum permitted axle load. Combined with new locomotives, this would give increased efficiency in hauling the ore. The upgrade for the Ofoten Line would cost NOK 180 million, and would allow LKAB to increase the train weight from 4,100 to 8,600 tonnes (4,000 to 8,500 long tons; 4,500 to 9,500 short tons). In addition, heavier trains would have to be longer, so sufficient passing loops would have to be upgraded to 790 metres (2,590 ft).

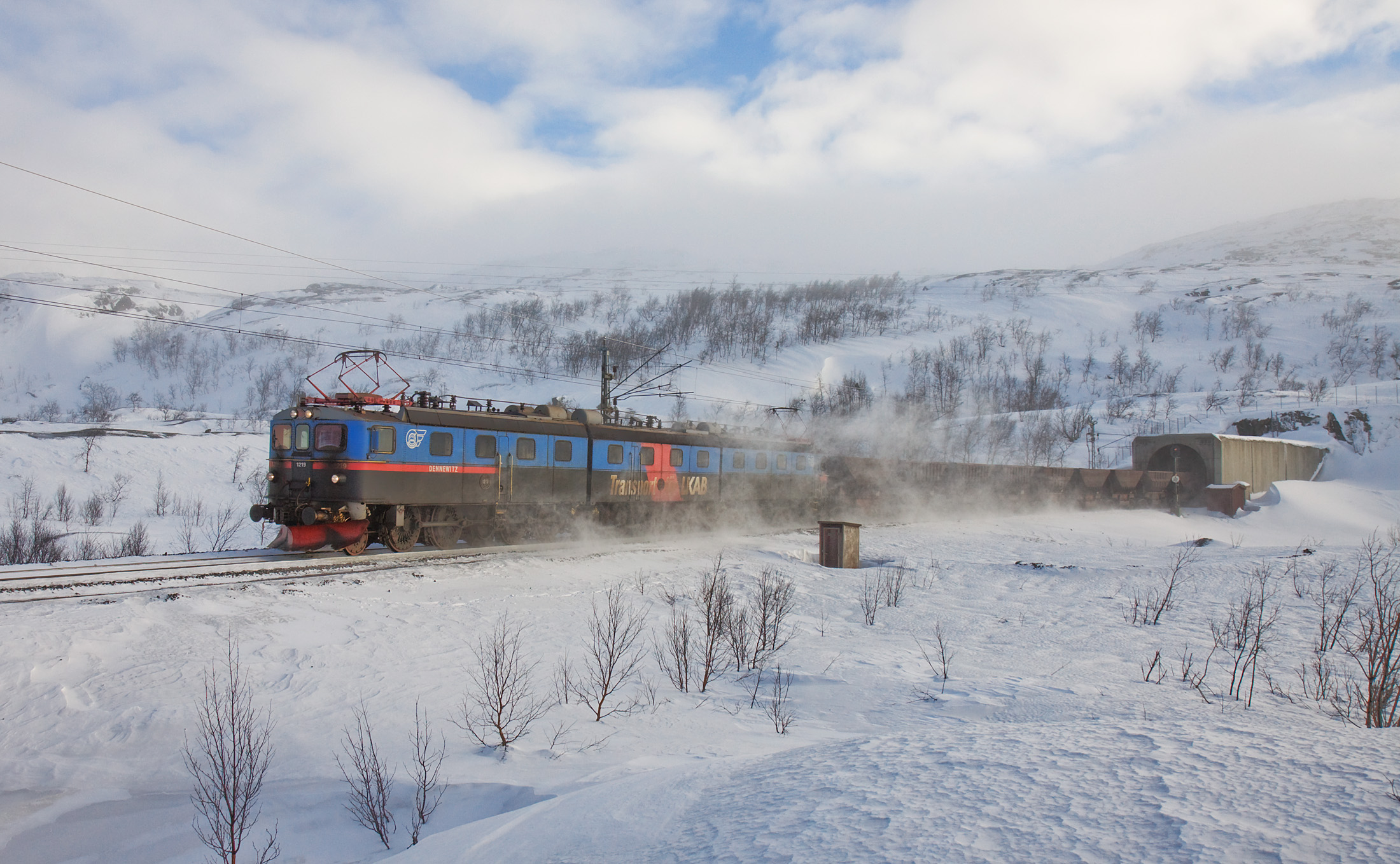
A Dm3 triple units

In March, LKAB awarded the contract to build 750 new 100-tonne hopper cars to Transnet of South Africa, after among others Norsk Verkstedindustri had been considered. In August, an agreement was reached whereby LKAB would pay for NOK 100 million of the NOK 130 million needed to upgrade the Ofoten Line. The contract to deliver 18 Iore locomotives was signed with Bombardier on 15 September 1998. LKAB bought SJ and NSB's share of MTAB in 1999, making MTAB a subsidiary.

The first twin unit locomotive was delivered in 2000, and serial delivery was made from 2002 to 2004. In March 2004, LKAB decided to not purchase the option for additional hopper cars from Transnet, and instead purchase 750 heavier cars from K-Industrier. Since 1969 the ore trains have been using the Soviet SA3 coupler. However, LKAB decided that these were not sufficiently strong for the new trains and decided that the Iore locomotives and the new hopper cars were to be delivered with Janney couplers (also known as AAR coupler). While the first pair of locomotives had a Janney couplers, the rest of the first batch were equipped with SA3 couplers to handle the existing hopper cars, and later retrofitted with Janney couplers. In 2003, the Ore Line from Kiruna to Riskgränsen and the Ofoten Line were finished upgraded to 30 tonne axle load, allowing half the trains to operate with maximum capacity.

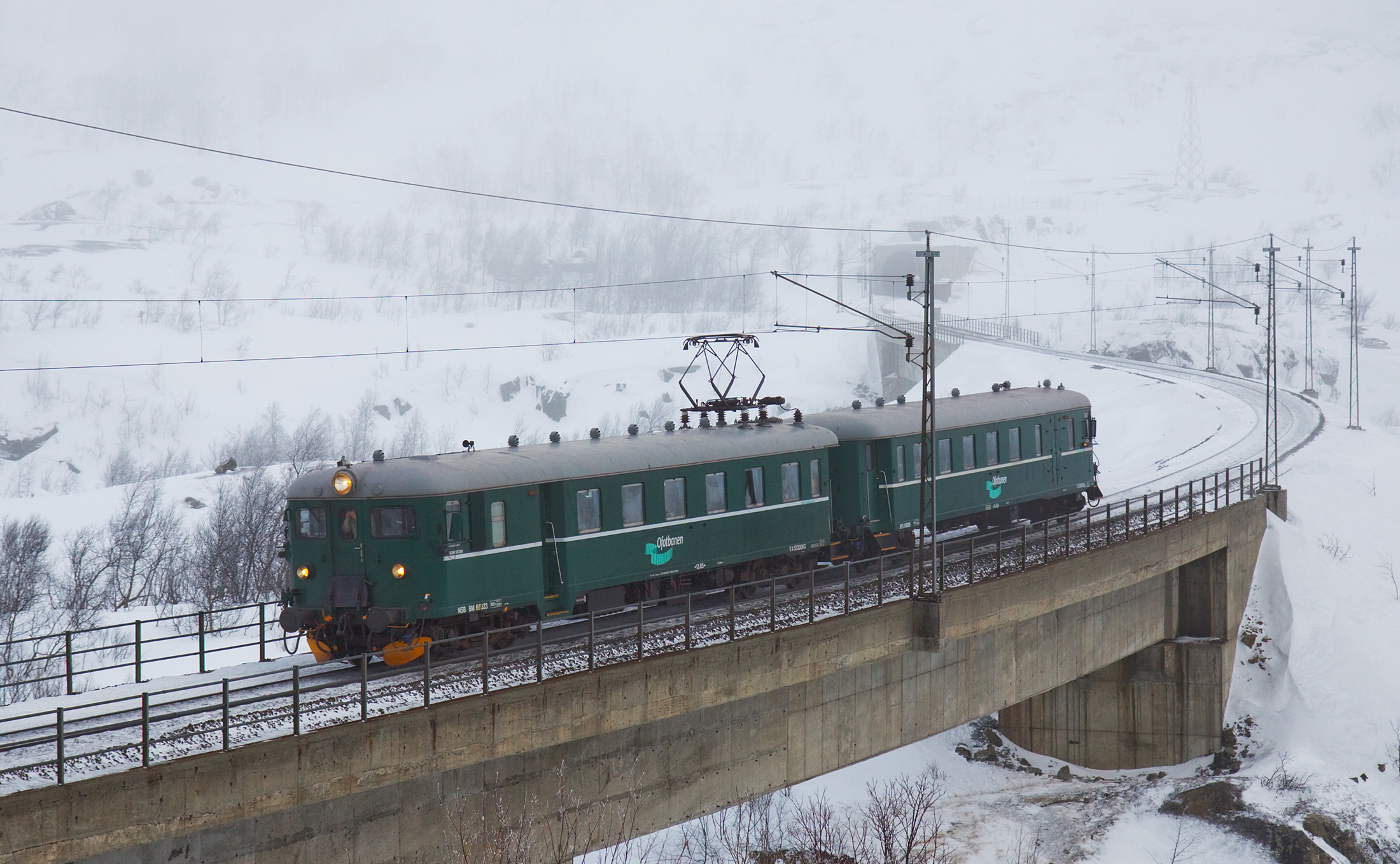
An Ofotbanen Class 68 unit

Ofotbanen AS was founded on 20 March 2001. In November, it bought five used Di 3 for NOK 250,000 each, well under market price, from NSB. In 2003, NSB announced that they wanted to discontinue their operations in Narvik, hoping they could leave operation of passenger trains on the Ofoten Line to Ofotbanen. In May, NSB signed an agreement with Ofotbanen, where the latter would take over NSB's responsibilities to operate trains from Narvik Station to Riksgränsen Station. The initial contract would last until 2006, and NSB paid NOK 13 million for the service. From 15 June, Ofotbanen took over all passenger transport on the line, including employing all former NSB employees in Narvik. On the same day, Connex Tåg (later Veolia) took over the operations on the Swedish side of the border after winning a public service obligation contract with the Swedish Government, and dismissing SJ of the right to offer the service. In 2003, Narvik Municipality and the Port of Narvik both became minority shareholders in Ofotbanen. In April, Ofotbanen received a permit to operate in Sweden, and started offering charter trains between Narvik and Kiruna in Sweden, primarily for cruise ship passengers.

The Northern East West Freight Corridor was an initiative by the International Union of Railways aiming to establish a freight corridor from the Far East to North America. The route would use the Ofoten Line and transship from rail to ship at Narvik. The main report for the project was made in 2004, but since there had been limited funding for the project. In 2005, Ofotbanen entered the container freight market, with a train running from Narvik via Sweden to Oslo, both via the Meråker Line and via the Kongsvinger Line. The trains would continue to Drammen when necessary.

In 2008, the public service obligation contract on the Ofoten Line was won by SJ. This included a subsidy of NOK 3.0 million from the Norwegian Ministry of Transport and Communications for the 40 km (25 mi) section on the Norwegian side of the border. Therefore, SJ started operating trains all the way to Narvik, and Ofotbanen lost the contract of operating the trains on the Norwegian side of the border. Ofotbanen had been receiving NOK 4.5 million in subsidies from NSB for the operation from 15 June. Ofotbanen ceased operations on 29 July 2008, and filed for bankruptcy on 24 October.

On 23 August 2007, LKAB ordered another four twin units, with delivery in 2010 and 2011, and costing €52 million. This will replace all remaining Dm3. After delivery, six locomotives are used from Kiruna to Luleå, and twenty are used from Kiruna to Narvik. By 2009, sufficient passing loops had been built along the whole line from Narvik to Luleå to allow all trains to operate with full capacity. By 2011, LKAB's will be able to replace all the Dm3, and convert all the ore trains to 68 cars. This will increase the capacity from 28 to 33 million tonnes per year, and at the same time reduce the number of departures per day from 21 to 15.

In April 2026, the Swedish government cancelled the Boden-Narvik part of the night train route that was running between Stockholm and Narvik, citing budget constrains.
