= T44 RNA =

t44 RNA
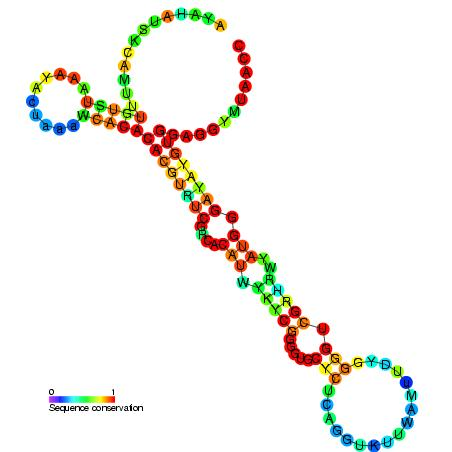
- Predicted secondary structure and sequence conservation of t44

Identifiers
- Symbol: t44
- Rfam: RF00127

Other data
- RNA type: Gene; sRNA
- Domain(s): Bacteria
- SO: SO:0000655
- PDB structures: PDBe

The T44 RNA family consists of a number of bacterial RNA genes of between 135 and 170 bases in length. The t44 gene has been identified in several species of enteric bacteria but homologs have also been identified in Pseudomonas and Coxiella species. The t44 gene is found between the map and rpsB genes in all species in the full alignment apart from Shigella flexneri. The function of this RNA is unknown.
