= NSB El 12 =

Class of Norwegian electric locomotives

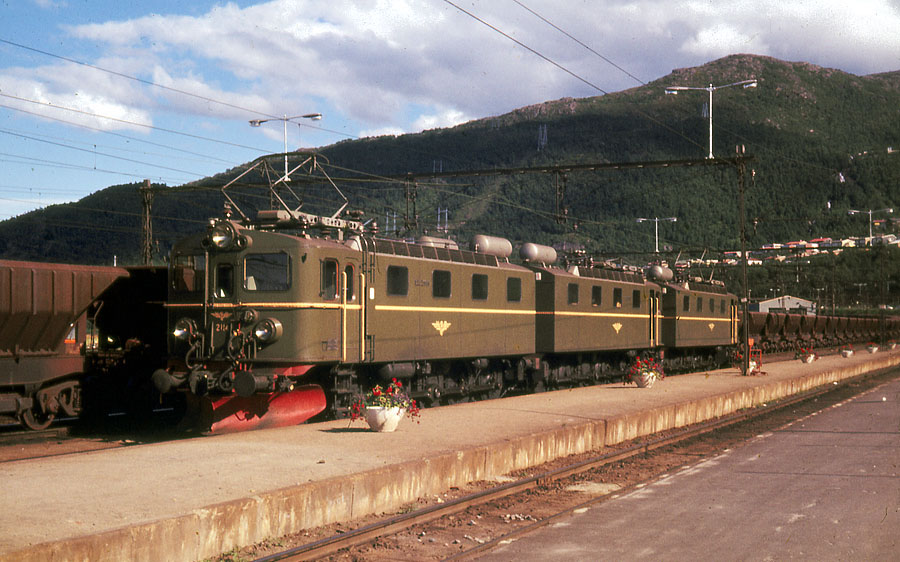
- Unit at Narvik Station in 1970
Type and origin
- Power type: Electric
- Builder: Motala Verkstad/NOHAB
- Build date: 1954 and 1957
- Total produced: 8
Specifications
- Configuration
  - UIC: 1′D (paired as 1′D+D1′)
- Gauge: 1,435 mm (4 ft 8 1/2 in)
- Length: 13.245 m (43 ft 5 in)
- Loco weight: 95 t (93 long tons; 105 short tons)
- Electric system/s: 15 kV 16.7 Hz Catenary
- Current pickup: Pantograph
Performance figures
- Maximum speed: 75 km/h (47 mph)
- Power output: 2,398 kW (3,220 hp)
Career
- Locale: Ofoten Line

NSB El 12 was an electric locomotive used by the Norwegian State Railways (NSB) to haul iron ore trains on Ofoten Line between 1957 and 1990. The locomotives were based on the Swedish Dm that was used with success on the connecting Iron Ore Line. The eight units were always operated in pairs or in triples and were numbered 12 2113 - 12 2120. Four double sets remain as heritage locomotives.

== History ==
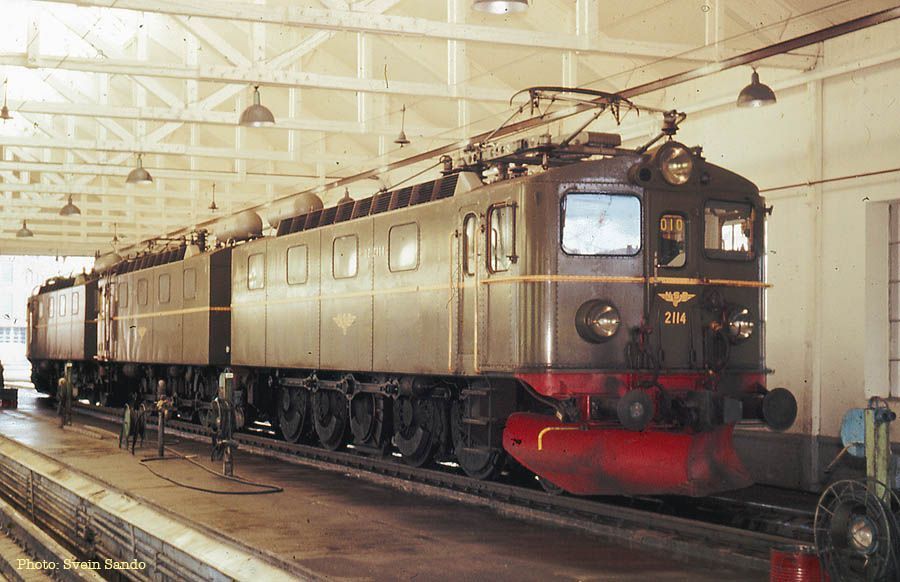
El 12.2114 at the shed in Narvik in 1970

After World War II the production resumed at the mines operated by LKAB at Kiruna and Malmberget with estimates of a 50% production increase within few years. To solve the problems with increased traffic, the railway companies had the choice of either building double track or hauling longer trains. The latter solution was chosen, and on the Norwegian side the ten El 3 locomotives were converted from five double sets to three triple sets with one reserve and the two El 4 converted to a double set. But this solution would require more locomotives.

The Swedish State Railways (SJ), who operated the trains from the mines to Riksgränsen, chose to buy 12 Dm units in 1952, based on the Da units from 1950. NSB chose to buy six more or less identical units from Motala Verkstad in 1954 and an additional two in 1957 from NOHAB. But the ore production continued to increase, and in 1960 SJ ordered a middle section for their Dm units, creating the Dm+Dm3+Dm unit configuration. NSB chose to rebuild three of their locomotive pairs to triple units, but in 1967 NSB ordered six new technically far more advanced El 15 locomotives. The El 12 units were taken out of service between 1989 and 1992.
