= NSB El 15 =

Class of electric locomotives

NSB El 15 BR 161
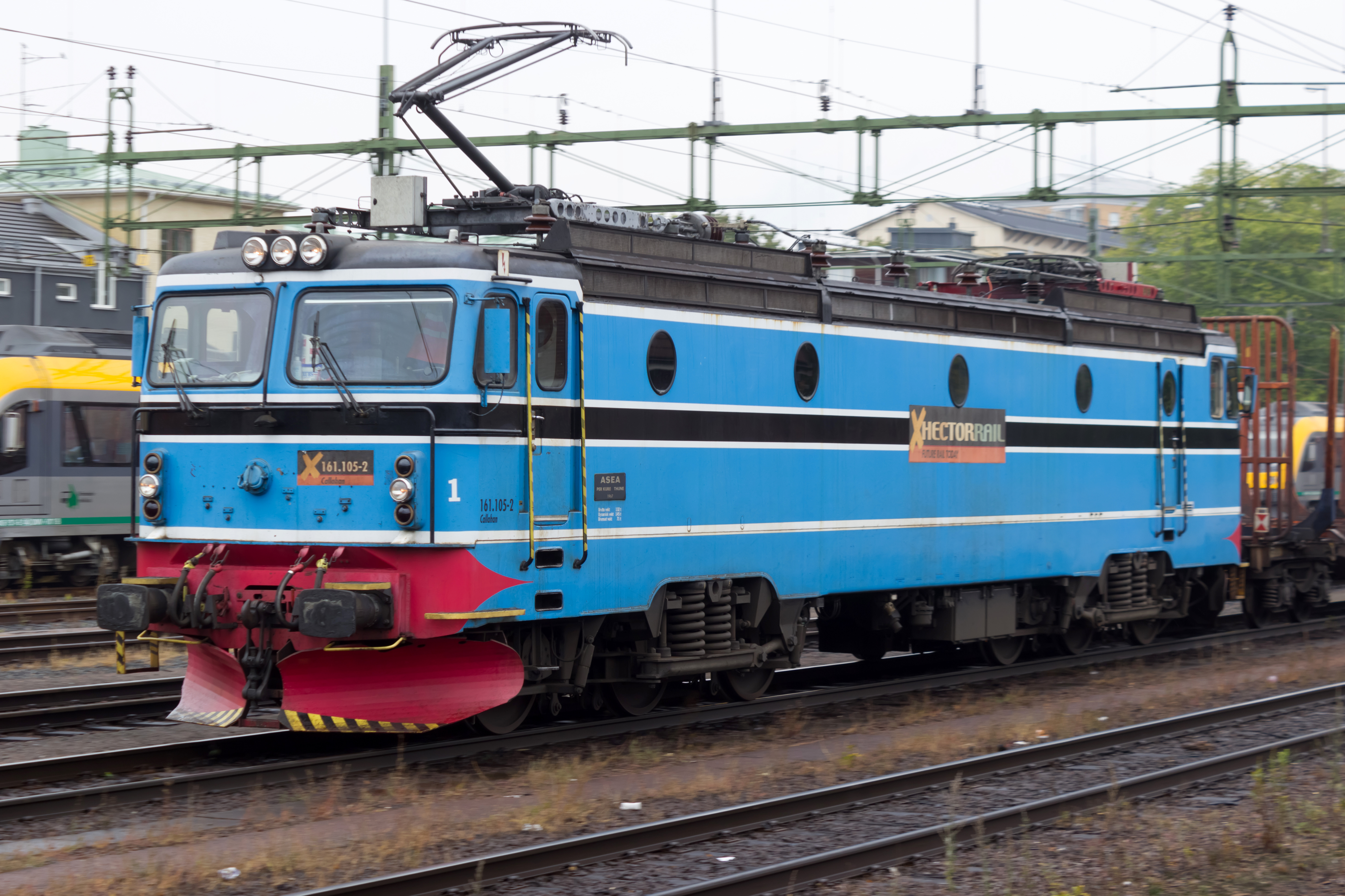
Type and origin
- Power type: Electric
- Builder: ASEA
- Build date: 1967
- Total produced: 6
Specifications
- Configuration
  - UIC: Co′Co′
- Gauge: 1,435 mm (4 ft 8 1/2 in) standard gauge
- Length: 19.8 m (65 ft 0 in)
- Loco weight: 132 t (130 long tons; 146 short tons)
- Electric system/s: 15 kV 16 2/3 Hz AC Catenary
- Current pickup: Pantograph
Performance figures
- Maximum speed: 120 km/h (75 mph)
- Power output: 5,400 kW (7,240 hp)
- Tractive effort: 420 kN (94,000 lbf)
Career
- Operators: Grenland Rail
- Class: El 15
- Number in class: 6
- Numbers: El 15 101 - El 15 106

NSB El 15 is a class of electric locomotives which are now operated by the Norwegian company Grenland Rail. The locomotives were originally built for the Norwegian State Railways (NSB) in 1967 to replace the NSB El 3 and NSB El 4 engines on Ofoten Line. The main task there is to pull heavy iron ore freight trains, and the El 15 is the most powerful engine which NSB has ever used.

== History ==
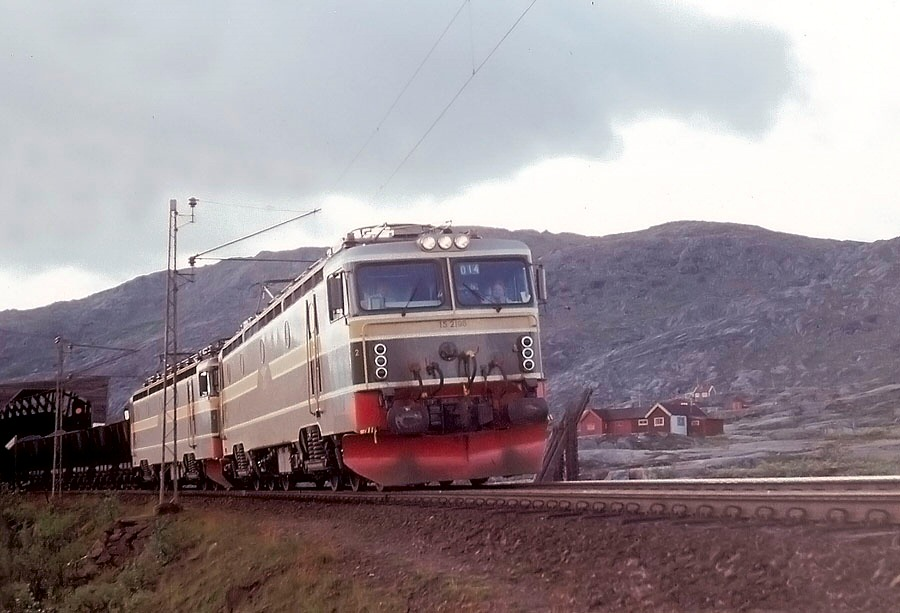
Twin El 15-unit hauling an ore train near Bjørnfjell on the Ofoten Line in 1970

After the electrification of Ofotbanen in 1923 NSB had been using El 3 and El 4 stock on the line. But in the 1960s these were getting worn out, and NSB decided that it needed to get new stock. NSB first acquired the El 12 stock parallel to the Swedish acquisition of the Dm3 locomotive. But unlike Statens Järnvägar, NSB chose to instead buy a newer technology locomotive from ASEA, based on the Romanian CFR 060 EA. Thus NSB managed to get the same power out of their two-engined El 15s as the Swedish got out of their three-engined Dm3s. Since the locomotives were to be operated in pairs, NSB considered only installing driver cabins on one end, but chose in the end to install them on both ends to allow the locomotives to operate more flexibly, including allowing them to operate passenger trains. The locomotives were numbered 15 2191 to 15 2196.

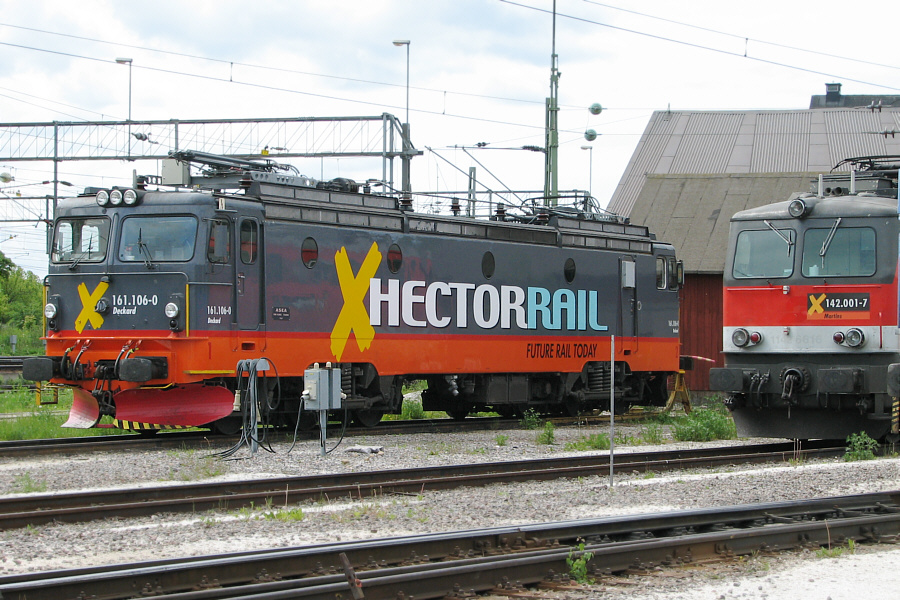
Hector Rail Hr 161.106.0 at Hallsberg, Sweden

In 1996 the operation of the ore trains was taken over by Malmtrafik, owned by NSB, SJ and LKAB, the owner of the mines. The new company ordered 18 new IORE locomotives from Bombardier and in 2004 the ageing engines were sold to Hector Rail. After deliveries of new locomotives to Hector Rail in 2019, they were taken out of service and were sold to the Norwegian company Grenland Rail in 2020, where they have been painted dark-blue and reclassified as El 15.
