= Skreia Line =

Railway line in Norway

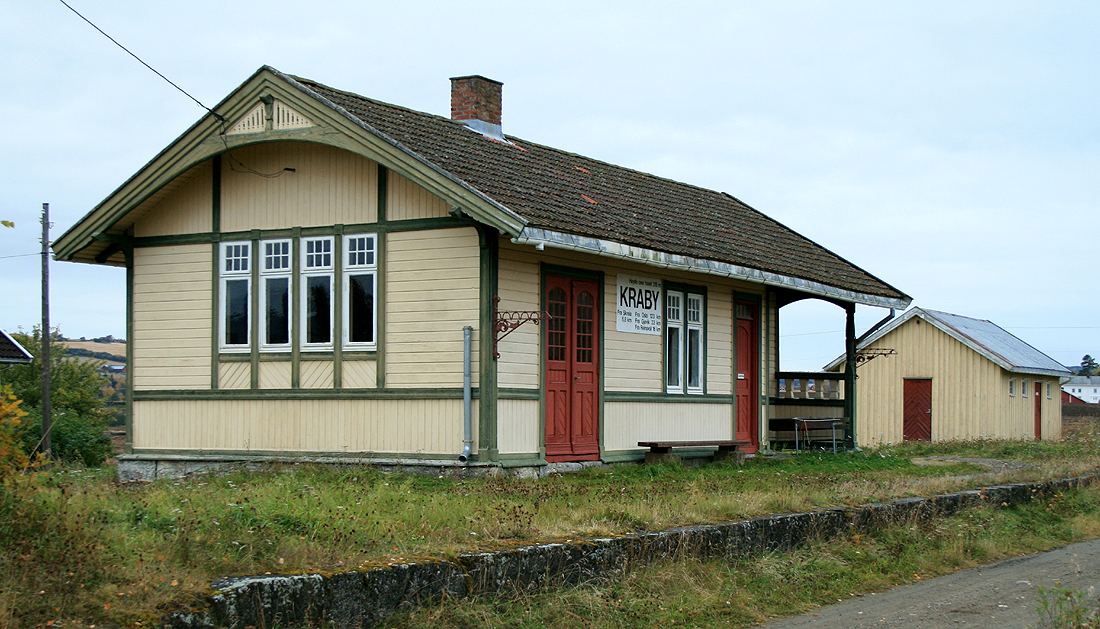
- Kraby Station

Overview
- Native name: Skreiabanen
- Status: Abandoned
- Owner: Norwegian State Railways
- Termini: Reinsvoll; Skreia
- Stations: 12

Service
- Type: Railway
- System: Norwegian railway
- Operator(s): Norwegian State Railways

History
- Opened: November 1902
- Closed: 1987

Technical
- Line length: 21.97 km
- Number of tracks: Single
- Character: Passenger and freight
- Track gauge: 1,435 mm (4 ft 8 1/2 in)
- Electrification: 15 kV 16.7 Hz AC
- Highest elevation: 356.1 m asl

The Skreia Line (Norwegian: Skreiabanen) is an abandoned railway line between Reinsvoll and Skreia in Toten, Norway. The 21.97 kilometer long single track rail was a branch line from the Gjøvik Line.

== History ==
The line was opened on 26 November 1902. All the stations and depots were drawn by Paul Due, who used a number of different styles, including Art Nouveau for Lena and Kraby while Skreia was in Dragestil. Originally the idea was that Gjøvikbanen would follow part of the route of Skreiabanen, but this was changed because of major industrial interests in Raufoss and Hunndalen. Passenger traffic was terminated in 1963 while freight traffic continued until 1987.

== Rail trail ==
In the mid 1990s the track was removed and converted to a Rail trail for pedestrian and bicycle traffic.

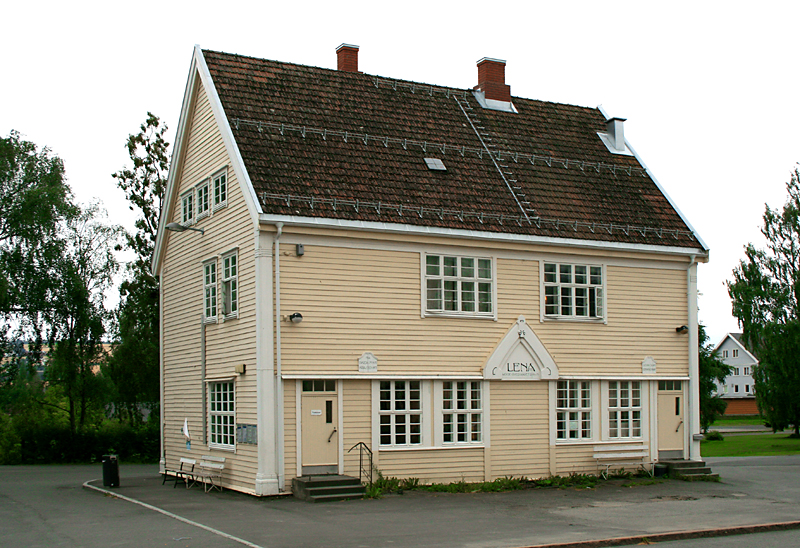
Lena

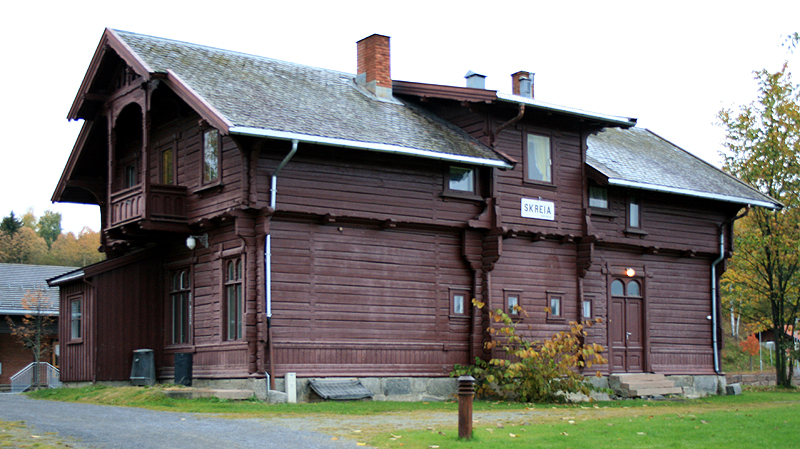
Skreia
