= SJ T44 =

Type of Swedish diesel-electric locomotive

T44
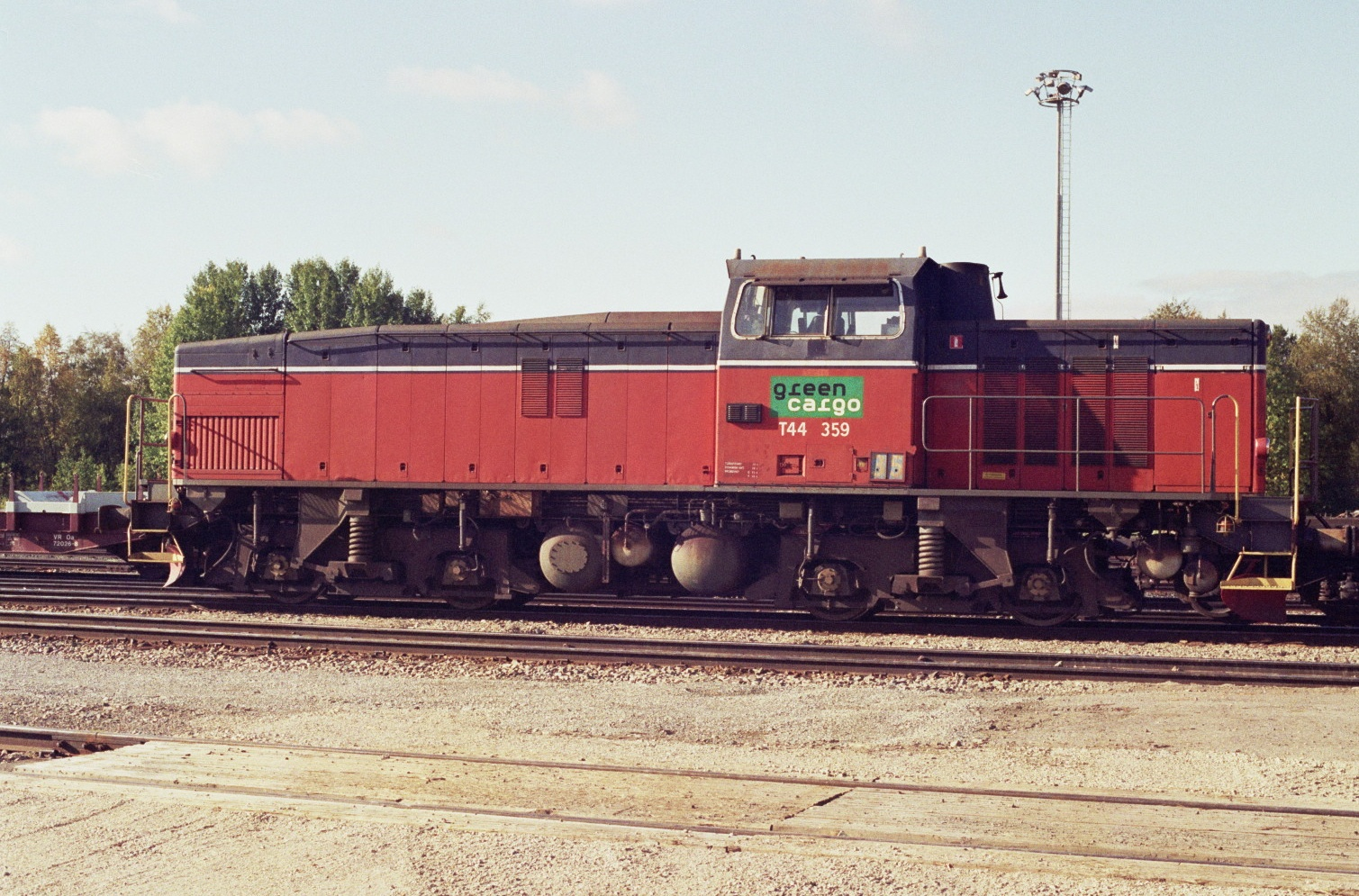
Type and origin
- Power type: Diesel-electric
- Builder: NOHAB and KVAB
- Model: EMD G22
- Build date: 1968–1987
- Total produced: 123
Specifications
- Configuration
  - UIC: Bo′Bo′
- Gauge: 1,435 mm (4 ft 8 1/2 in)
- Wheel diameter: 1,030 mm (41 in)
- Length: 15,400 mm (50 ft 6 in)
- Loco weight: 76 t (75 long tons; 84 short tons) tare weight
- Prime mover: General Motors 12-645E
- Engine type: V12 diesel
- Displacement: 127 L (7,800 cu in)
- Cylinders: 12
- Cylinder size: 9 1/16 in × 10 in (230 mm × 254 mm) bore x stroke
- Transmission: Electric
Performance figures
- Maximum speed: 100 km/h (62 mph)
- Power output: 1,235 kW (1,656 hp)
- Tractive effort: 220 kN (49,000 lb_{f})
Career
- Operators: Statens Järnvägar
- Numbers: 259–283, 314–323, 329–416
- Disposition: in service

T44 is a Swedish diesel-electric locomotive built by Nydqvist & Holm (NOHAB) and Kalmar Verkstad (KVAB) in 123 units between 1968 and 1987. It was the successor of T43, and used both for hauling and shunting. It is the most common diesel locomotive in Sweden, with state-owned Green Cargo as the largest operator. Other operators include Israel Railways (one), Malmtrafik (two) and formerly Norwegian State Railways (one, designated NSB Di 7) and Inlandsbanan AB.

== History ==
Though mainly used for shunting and freight hauling, T44 class members have occasionally been used to haul passenger trains. In the 1970s they were used on the unelectrified Borlänge-Mora line, and in 1990s on the Inland Line. Compared to the predecessor T43 class, the T44 is more powerful and has a modernized drivers cab, with better noise insulation, though there are many similarities between the models. In appearance the T44 is somewhat more square than the predecessors. Up to three T44s can run in multiple units.

In 1993, SJ T44 276 was sold to the NSB for use as a shunter on the Ofoten Line, and given the designation NSB Di 7, and numbered 634. This engine was transferred, along with SJ T44 283, to Malmtrafik in 1996. When the Swedish State Railways (Swedish: Statens Järnvägar, SJ) was split in 2001, Green Cargo took over all the T44 locomotives, though four were sold to the Swedish railway company TGOJ (now a subsidiary of Green Cargo). In 2007, Green Cargo has ordered a full renovation of 100 units from Bombardier Transportation which included new four-stroke engines from MTU (type 12V 4000 R43). The renovation is expected to extend the life-time with 15–20 years. The first rebuilt units were delivered in 2009 and are called Td.

== Gallery ==
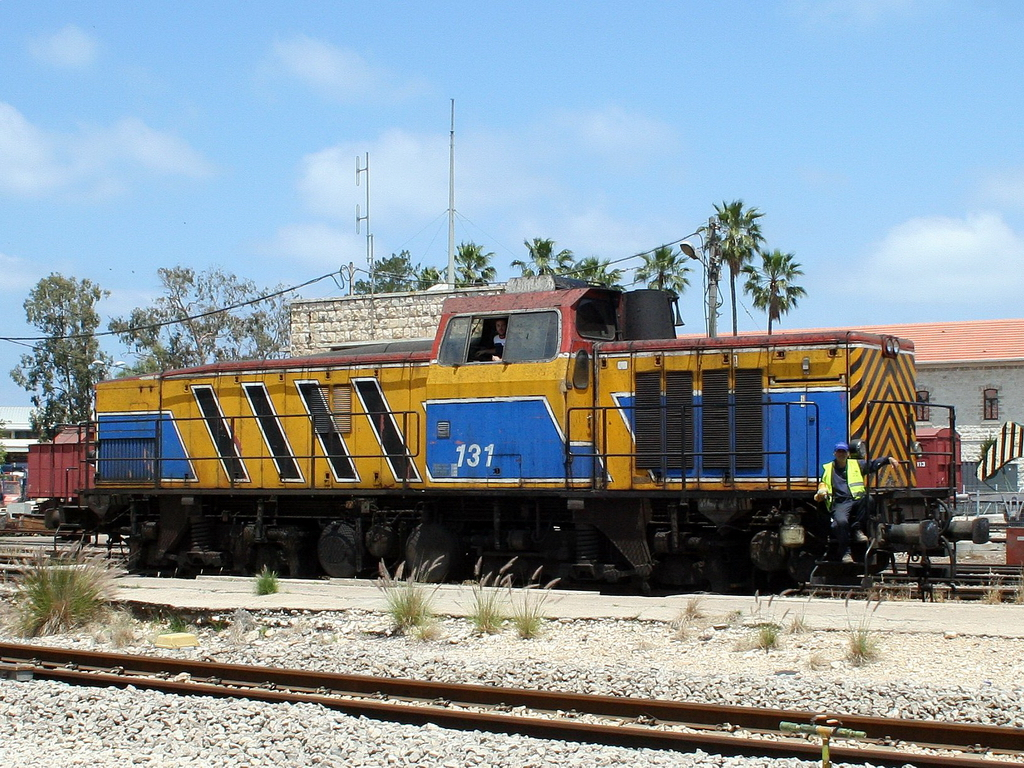
The only T44 at the service of Israel Railways

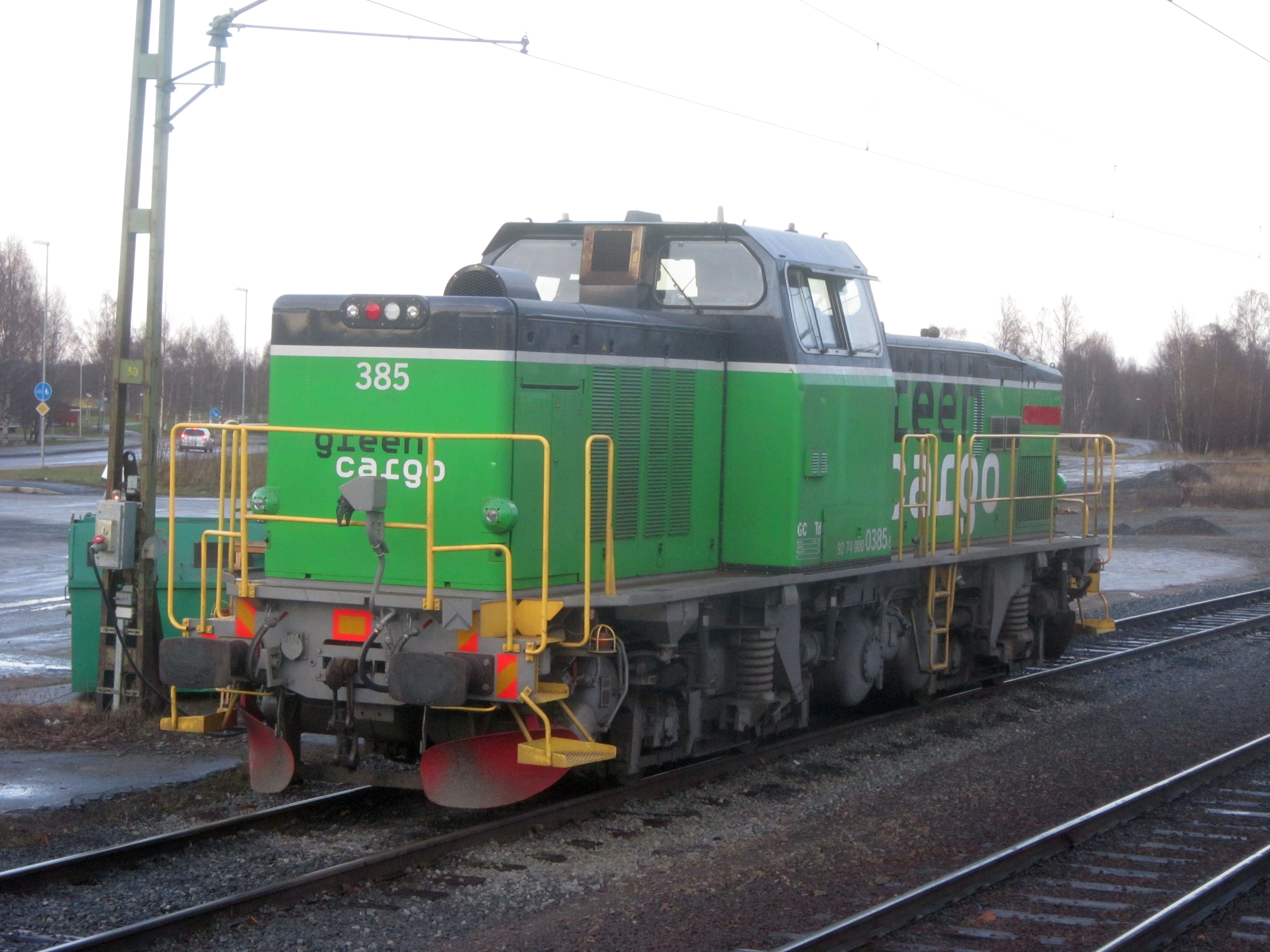
Green Cargo Td in Boden, Sweden
