= SJ O =

O
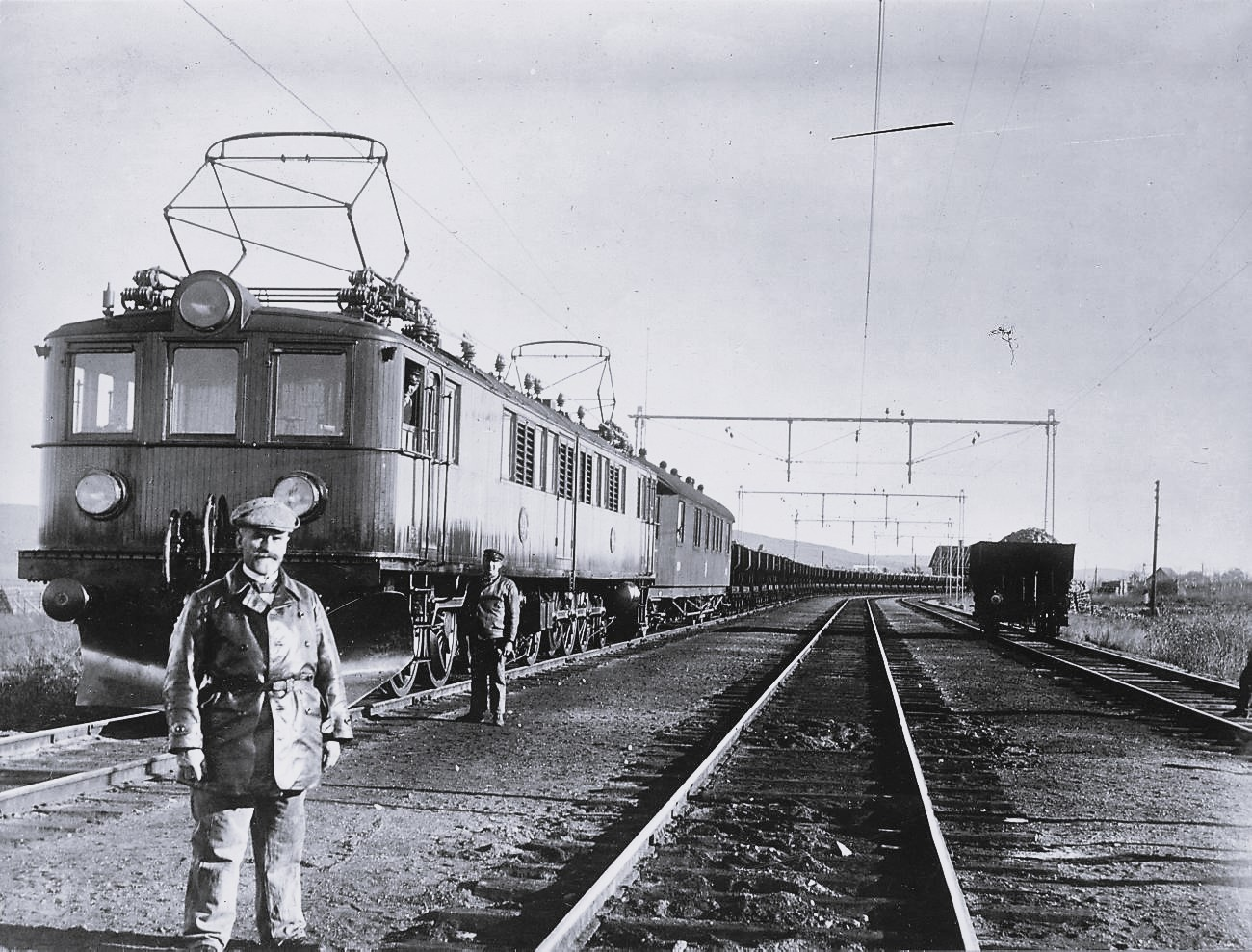
- Unit on the Iron Ore Line in 1950
Type and origin
- Power type: Electric
- Builder: ASEA; Siemens
- Build date: 1914-1915 (Oa); 1915 (Ob)
- Total produced: 11 pairs (Oa); 2 pairs (Ob)
Specifications
- Configuration
  - UIC: (1′C)+(C1′)
- Gauge: 1,435 mm (4 ft 8 1/2 in) standard gauge
- Wheel diameter: 1,100 mm (43.31 in)
- Length: 18.62 m (61 ft 1 1/8 in)
- Loco weight: approx. 136.8 t (134.6 long tons; 150.8 short tons) (Oa); 125.8 t (123.8 long tons; 138.7 short tons) (Ob)
- Electric system/s: 15 kV 16.7 Hz AC Catenary
- Current pickup: Pantograph
Performance figures
- Maximum speed: 60 km/h (37 mph)
- Power output: 1,200 kW (1,600 hp)
Career
- Operators: Swedish State Railways

O is a series of electric locomotives used by Swedish State Railways (Swedish: Statens Järnvägar, SJ) for hauling heavy iron ore trains on the Iron Ore Line in Sweden. The type Oa locomotives were built by Siemens and type Ob were built by ASEA.

== History ==
The O series was built for the Malmbanan (Iron Ore Line), the first electrified mainline railway in Sweden. (Note: The narrow-gauge Djursholmsbanan had opened in 1890) ASEA started testing out technology with a test unit in 1908, and by 1914 the first Oa locomotive was delivered, along with the passenger hauling Pa. At first it was the northern part of Malmbanan, from Kiruna to Narvik that was electrified. The steam locomotives had been hauling 28 wagons at 10 km/h, but the new agreement signed in 1913 with LKAB meant that SJ had to haul 40 wagons at 30 km/h to transport enough ore. The solution lay in a joint production between Siemens of Germany and ASEA. The Siemens locomotives were designated Oa while the ASEA locomotives were designated Ob. The trains had 1200 kW motors.

These stayed in service on the northern section until 1923 when the southern section to Luleå also was electrified, at which time they were moved to the southern section. A new series of Oe and Of locomotives were delivered. In the 1950s when larger trains were put into service, some of the Ofs were rebuilt to triple units, designated Of3. They were also supplemented with the new Dm-series that eventually replaced them.

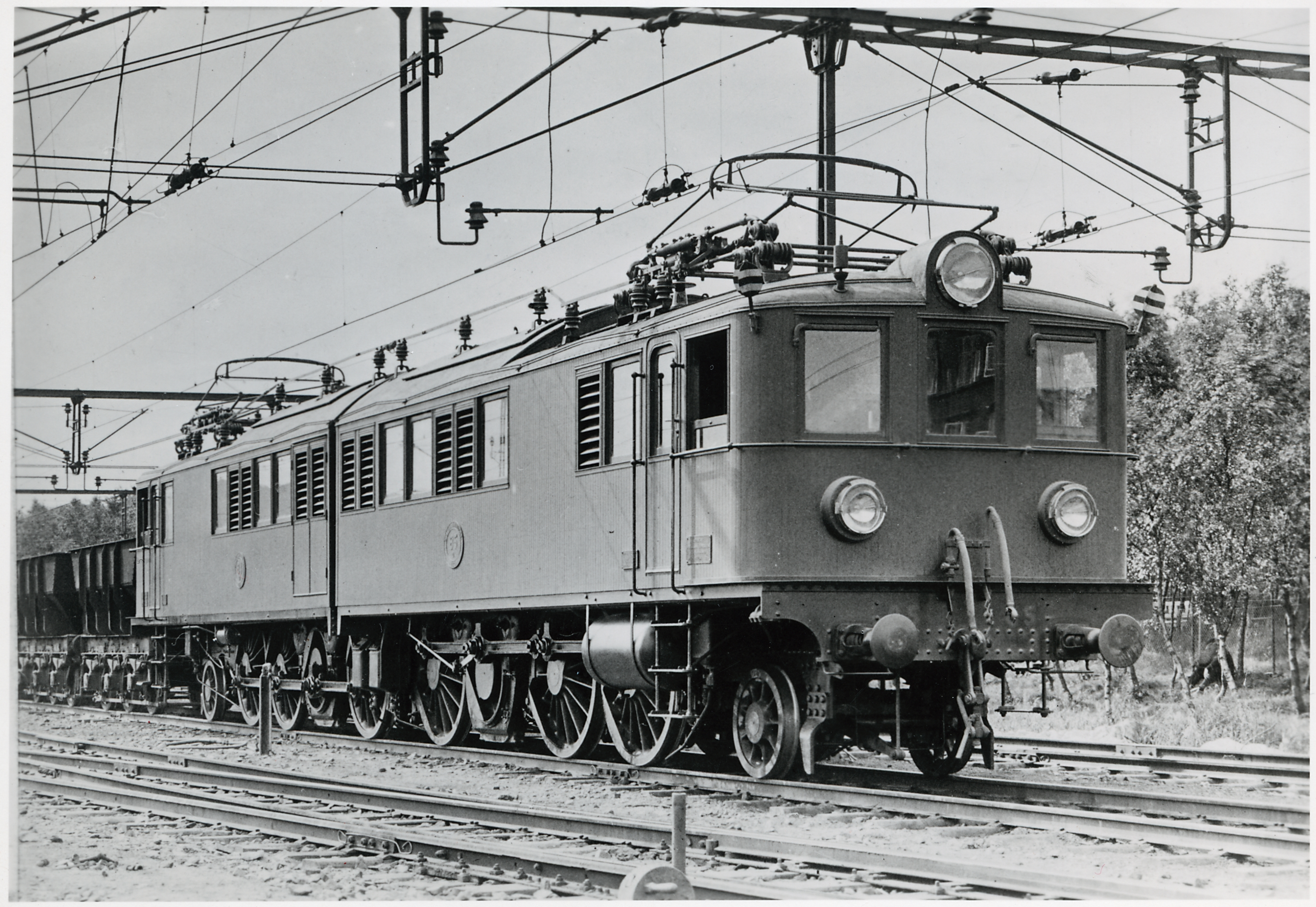
Of class locomotive pulling an iron ore train
