= SJ Da =

Da
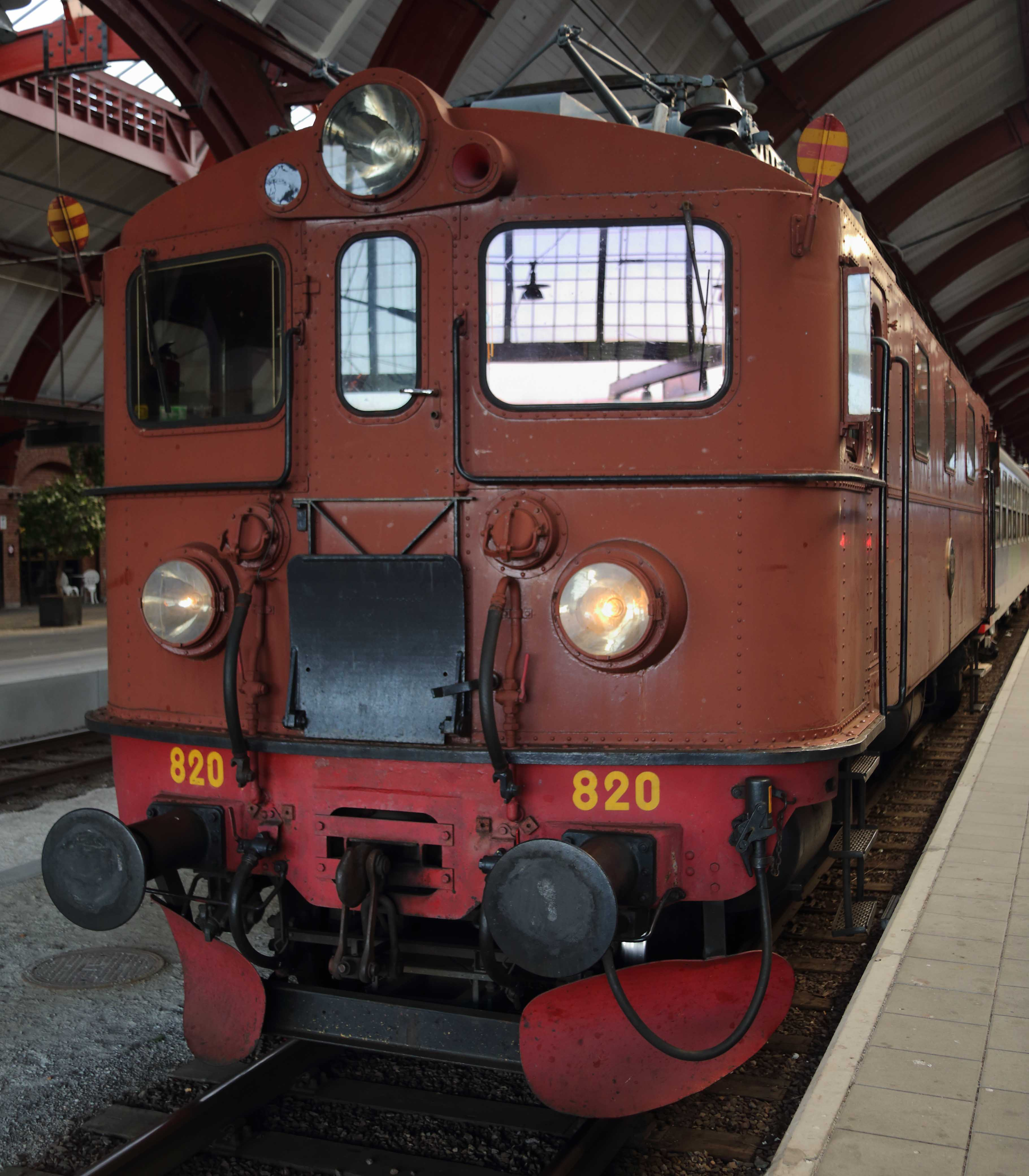
- Da heritage train in Malmö
Type and origin
- Power type: Electric
- Builder: ASEA
- Build date: 1952–1957
- Total produced: 93
Specifications
- Configuration
  - UIC: 1′C1′
- Gauge: 1,435 mm (4 ft 8 1/2 in)
- Wheel diameter: 1,530 mm (60.24 in)
- Length: 13,000 mm (42 ft 7 3/4 in)
- Loco weight: 75 tonnes (74 long tons; 83 short tons)
- Electric system/s: 15 kV 16 2/3 Hz AC catenary
- Current pickup(s): Pantograph
Performance figures
- Maximum speed: 100 km/h (62 mph)
- Power output: 1,840 kW (2,470 hp)
Career
- Operators: Statens Järnvägar
- Numbers: 790–823, 883–941

Da is a series of locomotives used by Swedish State Railways (Swedish: Statens Järnvägar, SJ). 93 units were built by ASEA between 1952 and 1957. They remained in service until the 1990s.

== History ==
After the last D-locomotive had been delivered in 1943, SJ needed more locomotives during the late 1940s with new lines being electrified. The solution was the Da, a modernised version of the D-type including the rigid-frame coupling rod layout that was by then regarded as obsolete by most other undertakings. It was used as a universal locomotive throughout the SJ system. A more powerful, but slower Dm series was delivered at the same time for use on Malmbanan. During the 1970s the Da's were rebuilt, including increased cab comfort. SJ started retiring the locos during the 1980s and had finished the task by the mid 1990s. Some units were bought by Tågfrakt and Tågkompaniet, later being sold to NetRail. One unit has been preserved by the Swedish Railway Museum.
