= SJ D =

Series of locomotives

D
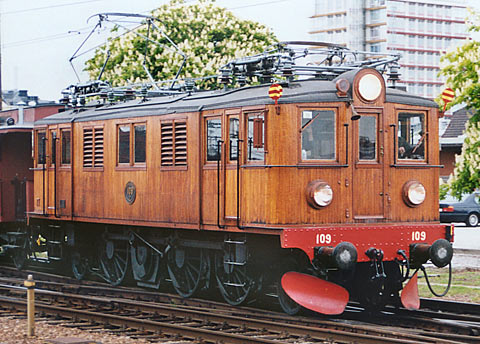
- A preserved D
Type and origin
- Power type: Electric
- Builder: ASEA
- Build date: 1925-1943
- Total produced: 333
Specifications
- Configuration
  - UIC: 1′C1′
- Gauge: 1,435 mm (4 ft 8 1/2 in)
- Wheel diameter: 1,530 mm (60.24 in)
- Wheelbase: (?)
- Length: 13,000 mm (42 ft 7 3/4 in) over buffers
- Loco weight: 80.4 tonnes (79.1 long tons; 88.6 short tons) (steel); 79.5 tonnes (78.2 long tons; 87.6 short tons) (wood)
- Electric system/s: 15 kV 16 2/3 Hz AC catenary
- Current pickup: Pantograph
Performance figures
- Maximum speed: 70 km/h (43 mph), later 75 km/h (47 mph) (Dg); 75 km/h (47 mph), later 100 km/h (62 mph) (Ds); 100 km/h (62 mph) (Dk, Du, Du2); 110 km/h (68 mph) (Dr2); 120 km/h (75 mph) (Dr)
- Power output: 1,220 kW (1,640 hp) (Ds, Dg); 1,660 kW (2,230 hp) (Dg, later); 1,470 kW (1,970 hp) (Dk); 1,840 kW (2,470 hp) (Du, Du2)
- Tractive effort: 141 kN (32,000 lb_{f}) (Ds); 187 kN (42,000 lb_{f}) (Dg, original); 216 kN (49,000 lb_{f}) (Dg, later); 151 kN (34,000 lb_{f}) (Df, original); 161 kN (36,000 lb_{f}) (Df, later)
Career
- Operators: Statens Järnvägar
- Numbers: 101-729 (with gaps)
- Retired: 1988

D is a series of locomotives used by Swedish State Railways (Swedish: Statens Järnvägar, SJ). 333 units were built by ASEA between 1925 and 1943. It was used for both passenger and freight trains until it was taken out of service in 1988.

== History ==
Though SJs first electric locomotive was the Oa series used on Malmbanan, it was not suitable for use on the main lines, due to low speeds. To solve this problem SJ surveyed a large section of locomotives abroad, before concluding with a design and placed an order with ASEA for 50 units. While ASEA was responsible for the electrical components, ASJ, NOHAB and Motala Verkstad were responsible for the mechanical parts. The first series consisted of two models, the Ds used for express trains and the Dg for freight trains. The former had 90 km/h as maximum speed while Dg only had 70 km/h. The first units were delivered in 1925 and tested on Malmbanan until Västra Stambanan between Stockholm and Gothenburg was finished in 1926. Additional deliveries were made until 333 units had been delivered by 1943. Through the history of production the original wooden body was replaced with a steel construction.

== Versions ==
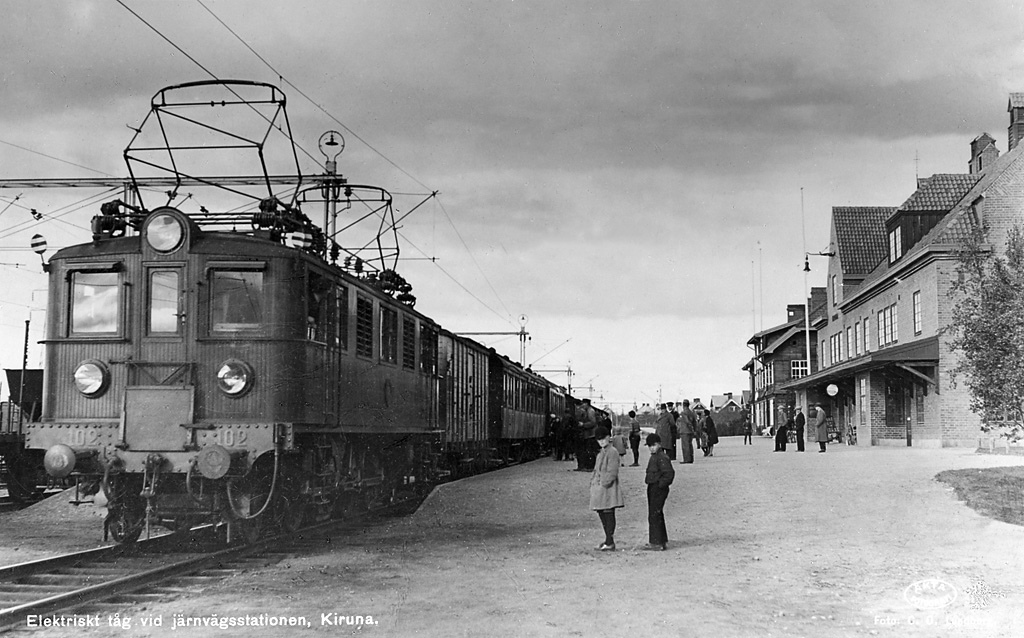
D loco at the railway station in Kiruna, Lappland, between 1940 and 1959

The subdesignation of the D-locomotives follows the function and not the appearance of the locos. To begin with one separated between freight and passenger locomotives, but from the Du-locomotive this separation disappeared since it could haul a freight train at 100 km/h.

=== Ds ===
Ds was the original D-locomotive made for passenger trains. At first they had maximum speed of 90 km/h, but after 1936 the gearing was changed and speed increased to 100 km/h. Production halted after a more powerful engine was introduced and new locomotives were designated Dk. The Ds locomotives were eventually transformed into Dk locomotives, and the designation Ds disappeared. 159 locos have once had been designated Ds.

=== Dg ===
Dg was the other original D-locomotive, geared for maximum 70 km/h and optimized for freight trains. From 1936 the max speed was increased to 75 km/h. This type was also later given a more powerful engine, but not a new designation. Thus there have been two types of Dg-locos. During World War II all wooden-bodied examples were rebuilt to Dg. It was in use until 1976. Eventually many Dgs were rebuilt to Du. In total 186 units have had the Dg designation, though not at the same time.

=== Dk ===
When the passenger locomotives were given more powerful motors, they were designated Dk. They had a maximum speed of 100 km/h. This is the last series of locomotives that was built new, all later types have been rebuilt, except the one-off experimental subtype Dr. The last Dk loco was built in 1943 and concluded eighteen years of D production. When the production of Da-locos started in 1953, the Dks were rebuilt to the same engine, and received the designation Du. The last use of Dk was in 1975. In total 117 have had the Dk designation, of which 73 were built as Dk.

=== Du ===
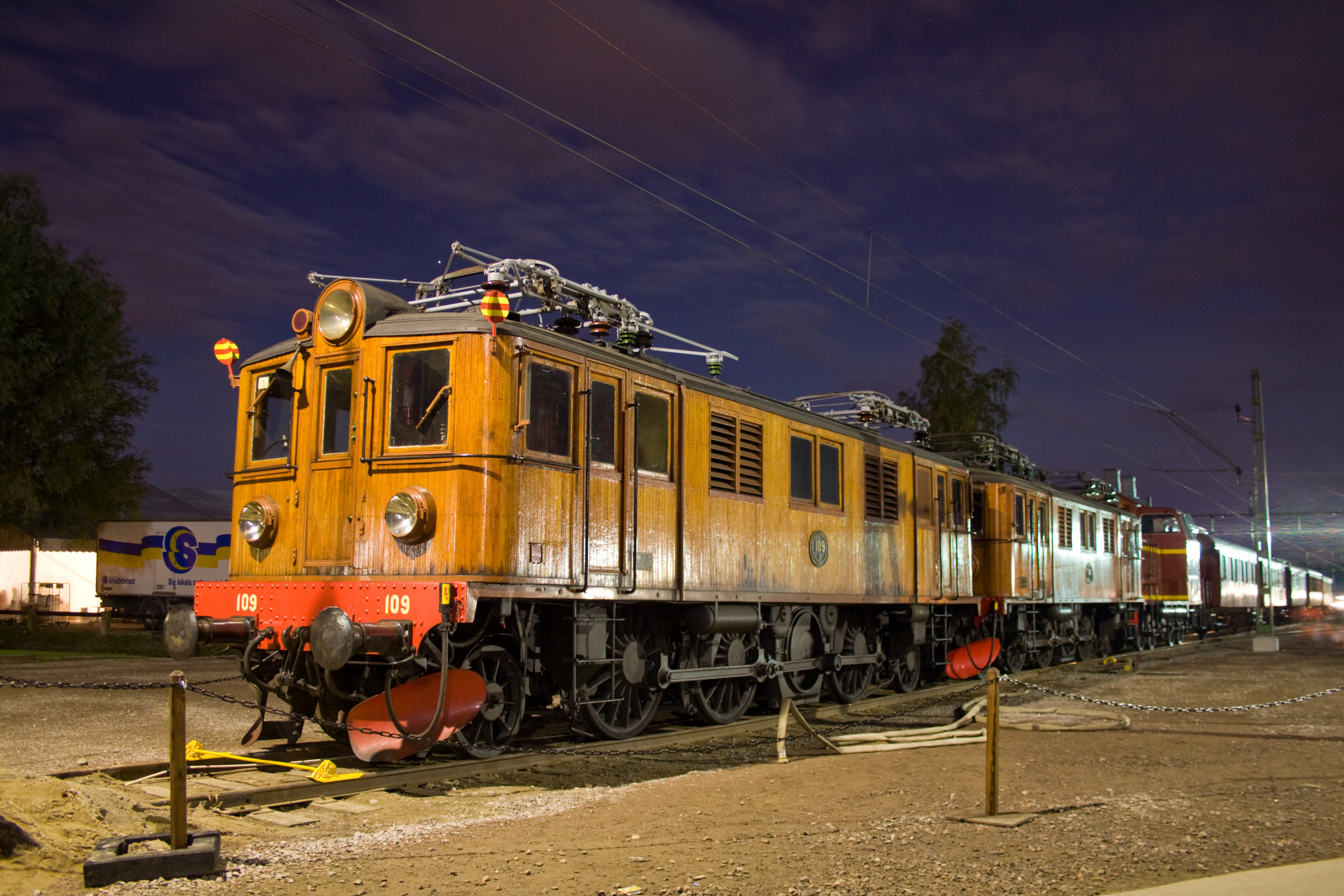
Du at Gävle

This locomotive came into existence during the 1950s when the Dk, Ds and Dg locos were upgraded to motors of the same type as in Da. Many of the engines also lost their gangway connections. In this rebuilding the difference between passenger and freight locos disappeared, since they now were capable of 100 km/h. The Du became a universal locomotive, though in the end it was mainly used for freight trains. It disappeared from service in 1977, with the dismantle of the wooden locos, while the steel units were rebuilt to Du2. 244 of the D units have had the Du designation.

=== Du2 ===
To use the D-series in the same pool as the Rc locomotives, the Dus were upgraded with multiple operation capabilities, so they could operate as double locomotives. This rebuilding started in 1967 and was concluded in 1976. 162 D-locos were rebuilt to Du2s. It was the last type in service until 1993, ending 63 years of service for D locomotives. The oldest unit in service had an age of 55 years.

=== Special versions ===
Three locomotives were built or rebuilt as experimental prototypes. These were Dr No. 415, a 1937 Dk modified before delivery to test higher speeds, 1944 modified to a normal Dk; Df, later Dr No. 208, rebuilt in 1948-9 with new motors and control systems and eventually the discarded equipment from No. 415; and Dg2 No 146 rebuilt with a fourth coupled axle and new control equipment after a collision in 1948.
