= SJ Rm =

Rm
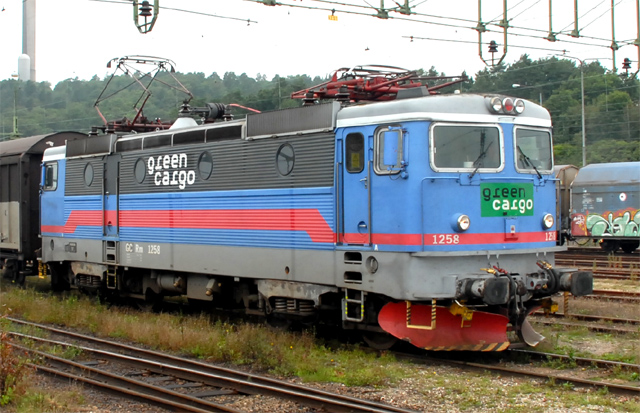
- SJ Rm 1258 in Uddevalla on 26 July 2007
Type and origin
- Power type: Electric
- Builder: ASEA
- Build date: 1977
- Total produced: 6
Specifications
- Configuration
  - UIC: Bo′Bo′
- Gauge: 1,435 mm (4 ft 8 1/2 in)
- Wheel diameter: 1,250 mm (49.21 in)
- Length: 15,520 mm (50 ft 11 in)
- Loco weight: 90 tonnes (89 long tons; 99 short tons)
- Electric system/s: 15 kV 16.7 Hz AC catenary
- Current pickup: Pantograph
Performance figures
- Maximum speed: 100 km/h (62 mph)
- Power output: 3,600 kW (4,800 hp)
- Tractive effort: 310 kN (70,000 lb_{f})

The SJ Class Rm is an electric locomotive operated by Swedish State Railways (Swedish: Statens Järnvägar, SJ) and later Green Cargo. The six locomotives are variants of the Rc locomotive and built by ASEA in 1977. The difference is smaller wheels giving higher pulling force, but lower maximum speed. They were used in triple-unit configuration on Malmbanan as supplements to Dm3-units, but later moved to other parts of the Swedish rail network after the transport needs on Malmbanan were reduced. When originally used to haul iron ore they were ballasted, fitted with SA3 couplings and additional set of brakes, but all these modifications were removed when the locomotives were put in ordinary freight operation. In the 1990s they were repainted from orange to blue. When SJ was split up, they were transferred to Green Cargo, stationed in Malmö. In 2013–2014 they were used again for iron ore traffic on Malmbanan. They went between Svappavaara and Narvik for Northland Resources, using SA3 couplings. After the Northland bankruptcy they were parked but returned to service in 2016 (with standard couplings).The locomotives are now used by Green cargo and hauling various freight trains all around Sweden.In 2023 Tågab bought the 6 remaining Rm locomotives and now are used buy Tågab for freight trains
