= SJ Pa =

Pa
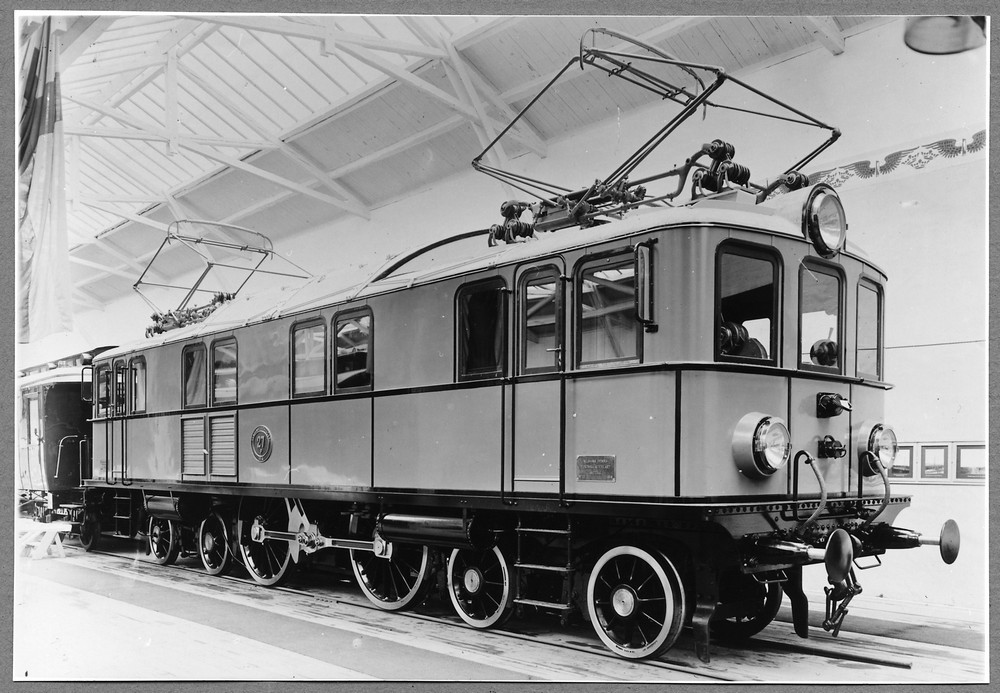
Type and origin
- Power type: Electric
- Builder: ASEA
- Build date: 1914-1915
- Total produced: 2
Specifications
- Configuration
  - Whyte: 4-4-4OE
  - UIC: 2'B2'
- Gauge: 1,435 mm (4 ft 8 1/2 in)
- Length: 14,050 mm (46 ft 1 1/8 in)
- Loco weight: 91.4 tonnes (90.0 long tons; 100.8 short tons)
- Electric system/s: 15 kV 16 2/3 Hz AC Catenary
- Current pickup: Pantograph
Performance figures
- Maximum speed: 100 km/h (62 mph)
- Power output: 665 kW (892 hp)
Career
- Operators: Statens Järnvägar
- Numbers: 27 - 28

Pa is an electric locomotive used by Swedish State Railways (Swedish: Statens Järnvägar, SJ) for hauling passenger trains on Malmbanan. It was delivered by ASEA in 1914-1915 and was in service until the 1950s. Malmbanan was the first electrified railway owned by the state (several private lines was already electrified) in Sweden, and SJ needed a fast locomotive to haul the passenger trains on the line. One of the units is preserved.
