= Iore =

Electric locomotive class built by Adtranz

MTAB Iore
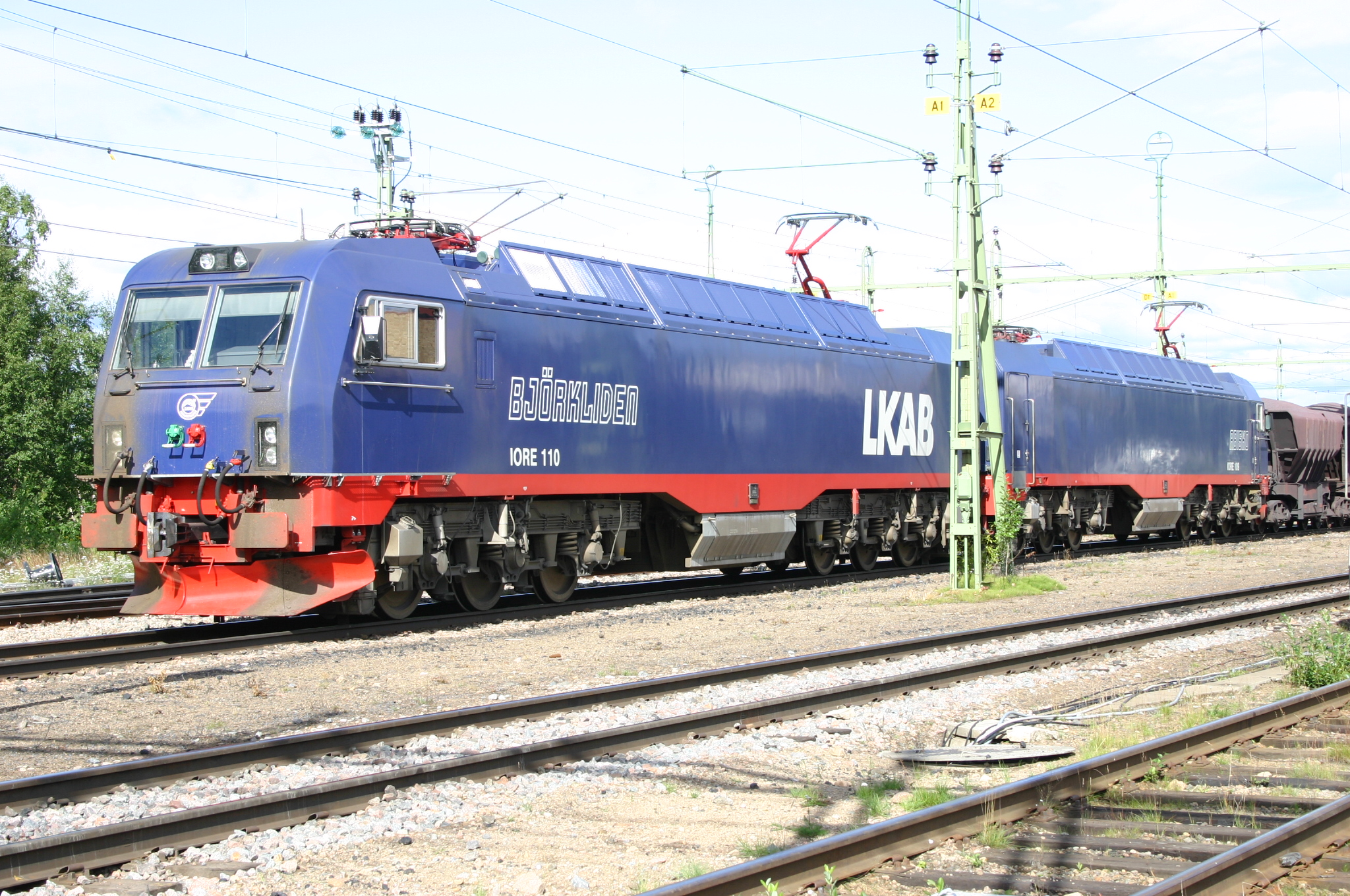
Type and origin
- Figures are for a single section, while normal operation is with two sections.
- Power type: Electric
- Builder: Adtranz/Bombardier Kassel
- Build date: 101+102: 2000; 103–118: 2002–2005; 119–126: 2010–2011; 127–134: 2013–2014
- Total produced: 34
Specifications
- Configuration
  - UIC: Co′Co′
- Gauge: 1,435 mm (4 ft 8 1/2 in)
- Bogies: 101–118: Adtranz/Bombardier Flexifloat; 119–134: Bombardier FLEXX Power 120H (same model re-branded)
- Wheel diameter: new: 1,250 mm (49.21 in) worn: 1,150 mm (45.28 in)
- Wheelbase: of the bogie: 1,920 mm (75 5/8 in) bogie center distance: 12,890 mm (42 ft 3 1/2 in)
- Length: 22,905 mm (75 ft 1 3/4 in)
- Width: 2,950 mm (9 ft 8 1/8 in)
- Height: to lowered pantograph: 4,465 mm (14 ft 7 3/4 in)
- Axle load: 30 t (29.5 long tons; 33.1 short tons)
- Loco weight: 180 t (177 long tons; 198 short tons)
- Electric system/s: 15 kV 16 2/3 Hz AC catenary
- Current pickup: Pantograph
- Traction motors: Three-phase asynchronous induction motors; Model 6-FRA 7072 D, controlled by GTO thyristor-based VVVF inverters
- Transmission: 1:6.267
- Loco brake: Regenerative, air with wheel tread brake
- Safety systems: ATC
Performance figures
- Maximum speed: 80 km/h (50 mph)
- Power output
  - Starting: 5,508 kW (7,386 hp) (Short time; Boost mode)
  - Continuous: 5,400 kW (7,200 hp)
- Tractive effort: 600 kN (130,000 lbf) starting to 32 km/h (20 mph); 700 kN (160,000 lbf) starting to 10 km/h (6 mph) in boost mode in case of stalls
Career
- Operators: LKAB Malmtrafik
- Class: IORE
- Numbers: 101–134
- Locale: Iron Ore Line, Sweden; Ofoten Line, Norway

Iore, often stylized IORE, is a class of 34 electric locomotives built by Adtranz and its successor, Bombardier Transportation, for the Swedish mining company LKAB's railway division, MTAB. The class is a variation of Adtranz's Octeon modular product platform, thus related to Bombardier's later TRAXX platform. The locomotives are considered to be one of the world's most powerful locomotives and haul iron ore freight trains on the Iron Ore Line and Ofoten Line in Sweden and Norway, respectively. The 8,600-tonne (8,500-long-ton; 9,500-short-ton) 68-car trains are hauled by two single-ended Co′Co′ locomotives, each with a power output of 5,400 kW (7,200 hp). Each operates with 600 kilonewtons (130,000 pounds-force) tractive effort and has a maximum speed of 80 km/h (50 mph). Delivery of the first series of 18 locomotives was made from 2000 to 2004, and they replaced some of the aging Dm3 and El 15 units. In 2007, eight more vehicles (4 double units) were ordered, with production to be completed by 2011, by which time, another four double units were ordered. These units were delivered from 2013 to 2014.

== History ==
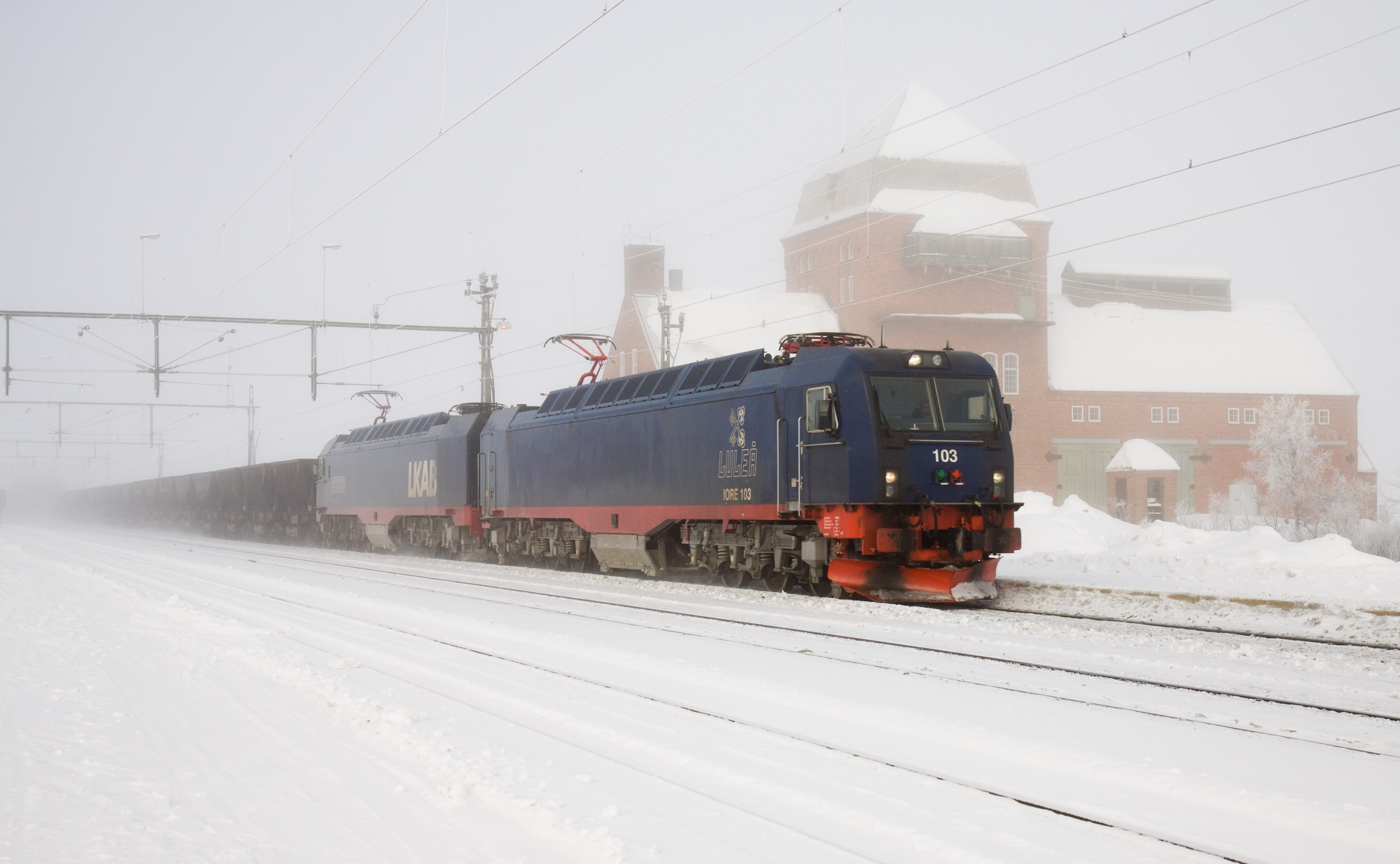
An Iore-hauled train passing Vassijaure

The Ofoten Line and the Iron Ore Line are two railroad lines which were built to allow iron ore to be hauled from the LKAB's mines in Kiruna, Svappavaara and Malmberget in Sweden to Luleå on the Baltic Sea in Sweden and to Narvik on the Norwegian Sea in Norway. Historically, these lines were operated by the Norwegian State Railways (NSB) in Norway and the Swedish State Railways (SJ) in Sweden, but in 1996 the operations, but not the infrastructure, were transferred to the new company Malmtrafik i Kiruna (MTAB), a joint venture between LKAB, NSB and SJ, and its Norwegian subsidiary Malmtrafikk (MTAS). At the time, the line was using El 15 and Dm3 locomotives.

In 1998, LKAB estimated a steady 35% increase in iron ore production until 2005, and requested that the governments grant sufficient funding to upgrade the lines from 25-tonne (25-long-ton; 28-short-ton) to 30-tonne (30-long-ton; 33-short-ton) maximum permitted axle load. Combined with new locomotives, this would give increased efficiency in hauling the ore from the mines. The upgrade was estimated to cost 180 million Norwegian krone (NOK) for the Ofoten Line alone.

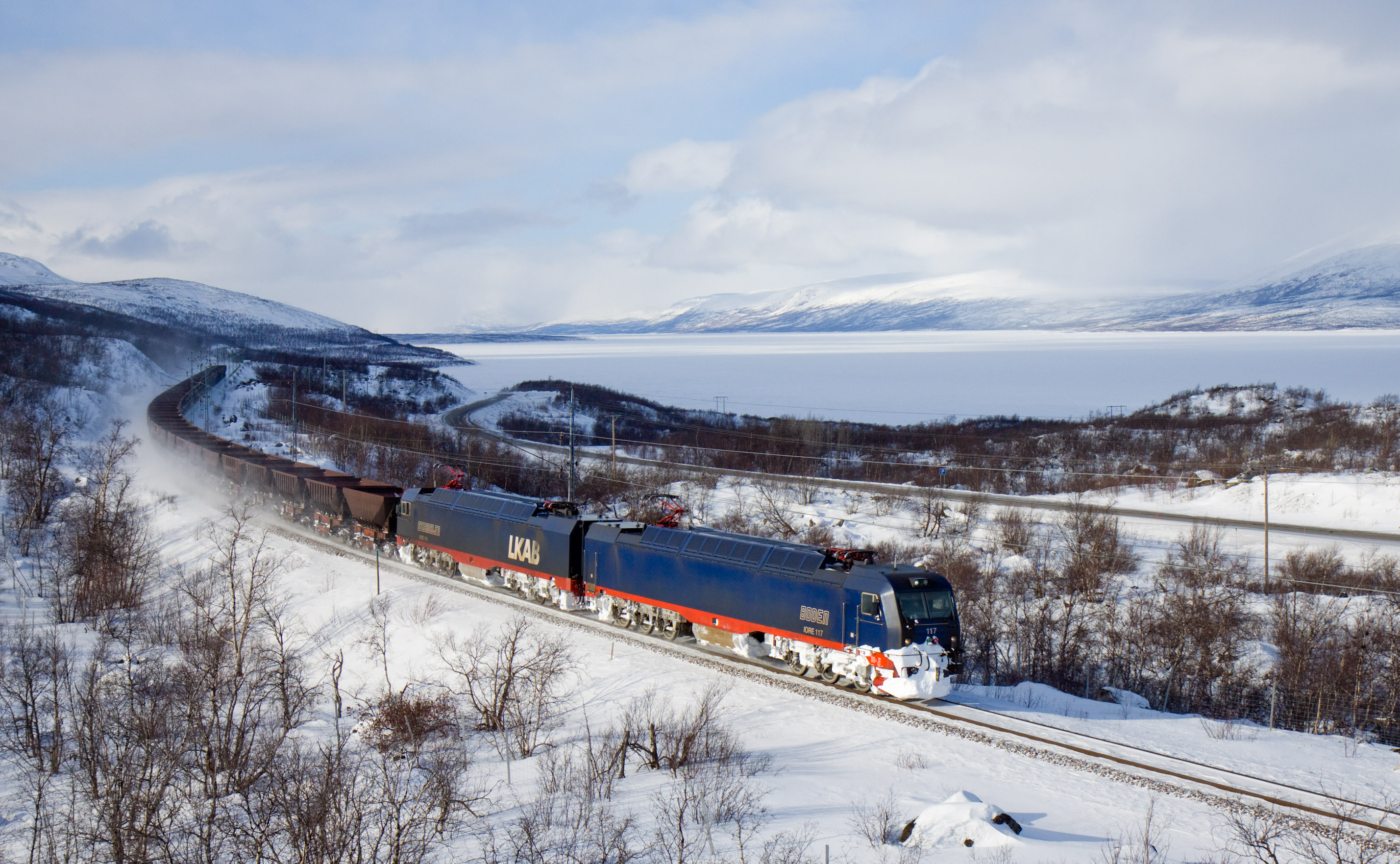
An Iore hauling an empty ore train near Torneträsk

In March 1998, LKAB awarded the contract to build 750 new 100-tonne hopper cars to Transnet of South Africa. In August, an agreement was reached whereby LKAB would pay NOK 100 million of the NOK 130 million needed to upgrade the Ofoten Line. The contract to deliver 18 locomotives was signed with Adtranz Switzerland on 15 September 1998. In 1999, LKAB bought SJ's and NSB's share in MTAB.

The first two sections were delivered by Adtranz in August 2000, and was subjected to intensive tests before the manufacture of the rest of the series. Commissioning concluded in December 2000, the locomotive started regular service on 10 January 2001, and started operation with the new hopper cars and 30-tonne (30-long-ton; 33-short-ton) axle load on 7 March 2001. In May 2001, Bombardier Transportation took over Adtranz. Bombardier delivered the rest of the Iore series from 2002 to 2005. In March 2004, LKAB decided not to purchase additional hopper cars from Transnet, and instead purchased 750 heavier cars from K-Industrier. Since 1969, the ore trains have been using the Soviet SA3 coupler. However, LKAB wanted to also try Janney couplers (also known as AAR coupler, used in much heavier trains in USA and South Africa), as the SA3 couplers were not much tested with the new weights. While the first pair of locomotives had Janney couplers, the rest of the locomotives were equipped with SA3 couplers to handle the existing hopper cars, and the cars bought from K-Industrier. The locomotives and Transnet wagons with Janney couplers were retrofitted with SA3 couplers. In 2004, the El 15 locomotives were sold to Hector Rail.

On 23 August 2007, LKAB ordered another four twin units, with delivery in 2010 and 2011, and costing €52 million. These will replace all remaining Dm3 locomotives by 2011, and LKAB convert all the ore trains to 68 cars. This will increase the capacity from 28 to 33 million tonnes per year, and at the same time reduce the number of departures per day from 21 to 15.

The name Iore is a mixture between the term "iron ore", and the fictional character Eeyore from Winnie-the-Pooh, spelled "I-or" in Swedish.

== Specifications ==
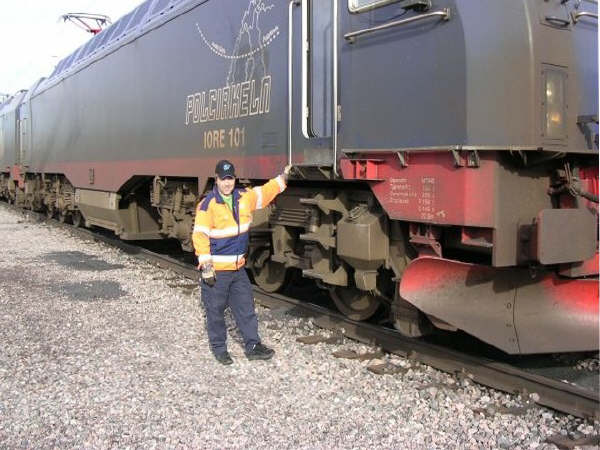
An Iore locomotive

The Iore class was a cold-adapted and heavy-haul derivation from Adtranz's Octeon modular electric locomotive platform, which was launched in 1998 on the basis of Adtranz's latest models for Deutsche Bahn at the time. Adtranz and later Bombardier Transportation conducted the final assembly of the locomotives at Kassel, Germany. When Bombardier Transportation introduced the brand name TRAXX for its updated modular locomotive platform, the type designation TRAXX H80 AC was applicable to the Iore class, however, it was excluded from the TRAXX family by the time of the second batch order in 2007. The manufacturer has also referred to the locomotive type as the Bombardier Kiruna.

Each Iore consists of twin units with one driver's cab at each. They normally operate in fixed units of two, making a pair capable of hauling a 8,600-tonne (8,500-long-ton; 9,500-short-ton) ore train. Technically an Iore section is also capable to operate as single locomotive, an option that is seldom used in operation. The units are fed with 15 kV 16.7 Hz AC via a pantograph. The power is transformed and then converted via a single water-cooled gate turn-off (GTO) thyristor based converter per bogie. The converters belong to the Camilla family, which was developed by ABB's Swiss branch as successor for its oil-cooled converters, and found previous use in the FS Class E464. The converters operate independently, with their own cooling and control systems and are shut down automatically in case of failure. The converters consist of seven line-replaceable unit modules to minimize maintenance costs. Each locomotive has six three-phase asynchronous alternating current traction motors, each rated at 918 kW (1,231 hp) and each powering a single axle. This gives a Co′Co′ wheel arrangement. The tractive effort of each locomotive is 600 kN (130,000 lb_{f}) and the maximum dynamic braking effort is 375 kN (84,000 lb_{f}). There is also a boost function, allowing a temporary traction effort of 700 kN (160,000 lb_{f}). The units are capable of 80 km/h (50 mph) in single runs, 70 km/h (43 mph) with empty trains and 60 km/h (37 mph) with loaded trains.

The locomotives are 22.905 m (75 ft 1.8 in) long, 4.465 m (14 ft 7.8 in) tall and 2.950 m (9 ft 8.1 in) wide. The distance between the bogie centers is 12.890 m (42 ft 3.5 in) and the bogie wheel-base is 1.920 m (6 ft 3.6 in). The wheel diameter is 1.250 m (4 ft 1.2 in) when new and 1.150 m (3 ft 9.3 in) when worn. Each locomotive weighs 180 tonnes (180 long tons; 200 short tons), of which 38 tonnes (37 long tons; 42 short tons) is electrical equipment. Each locomotive has 30 tonnes (30 long tons; 33 short tons) of dead weight to increase the locomotive's weight to the maximum axle weight, and further weight increase has been achieved by making the walls 4 centimetres (1.6 in) wide with armored steel. The extra wall thickness also provides for increased structural strength, to withstand collisions with snowdrifts and elk. The sides of the walls were built as flat as possible to reduce the sticking of blowing snow and ice formation.

The auxiliary system is powered via a separate transformer winding feeding three independent insulated gate bipolar transistor (IGBT) converters each providing a three-phase 400 volt system. The locomotive is designed with an open system architecture that can be adapted later. Diagnostic information is available to the driver and can be sent to the control center via GSM-R. The locomotive has a large and bright cab with space for up to three people. The second series of locomotives have an improved driver's chair, which has been retrofitted on the older trains. The machine room has a center hallway. All high-current equipment is located behind a door which can only be opened with a special key. This key is locked in such a way that it cannot be accessed without grounding the locomotive, and similarly the locomotive cannot be ungrounded again until the key is back in place.

== Operation ==
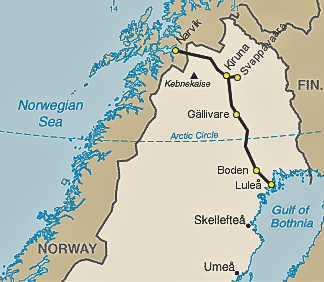
Map showing the Iron Ore and Ofoten Lines

LKAB operates iron ore mines in Kiruna, Svappavaara and Malmberget in Norrbotten County, Sweden. Most of the output is transported by rail to the ice-free Port of Narvik, a route named the Northern Circuit. A minority of the ore is transported to Luleå on the Southern Circuit. Located on the Baltic Sea, ore is shipped to Baltic customers, or delivered to furnaces operated by SSAB in Luleå and Oxelösund. The Iron Ore and Ofoten Lines are 536 km (333 mi) long, including the branch to Svappavaara, with the route from Kiruna to Narvik being 170 km (110 mi), and from Malmberget to Luleå being 220 km (140 mi). Operations are handled by LKAB's subsidiary Malmtrafik i Kiruna (MTAB) in Sweden, and Malmtrafikk (MTAS) in Norway. As of 2010, six pairs of the first batch Iore locomotives operate 11 to 13 trains daily in each direction on the Northern Circuit, and the remaining three pairs of the first batch operate five to six trains on the Southern Circuit. The four pairs of second-batch locomotives will replace Dm3 locomotives on the Northern Circuit by 2011.

The trains hauled by Iore are 68 cars long and weigh 8,600 tonnes (8,500 long tons; 9,500 short tons). From Riksgränsen on the national border to the Port of Narvik, the trains use only a fifth of the power they regenerate. The regenerated energy is sufficient to power the empty trains back up to the national border. Although the trains and hopper cars are all owned by LKAB, the line is owned by the Swedish Transport Administration and Bane NOR. The Iron Ore and Ofoten Lines are also used by passenger and container trains.

== See also ==
- China Railways HXD3B: a single-section freight locomotive based on the Iore
