= Boden Central Station =

Railway station in Norrbotten County, Sweden

Coordinates: 65.8289°N 21.7078°E

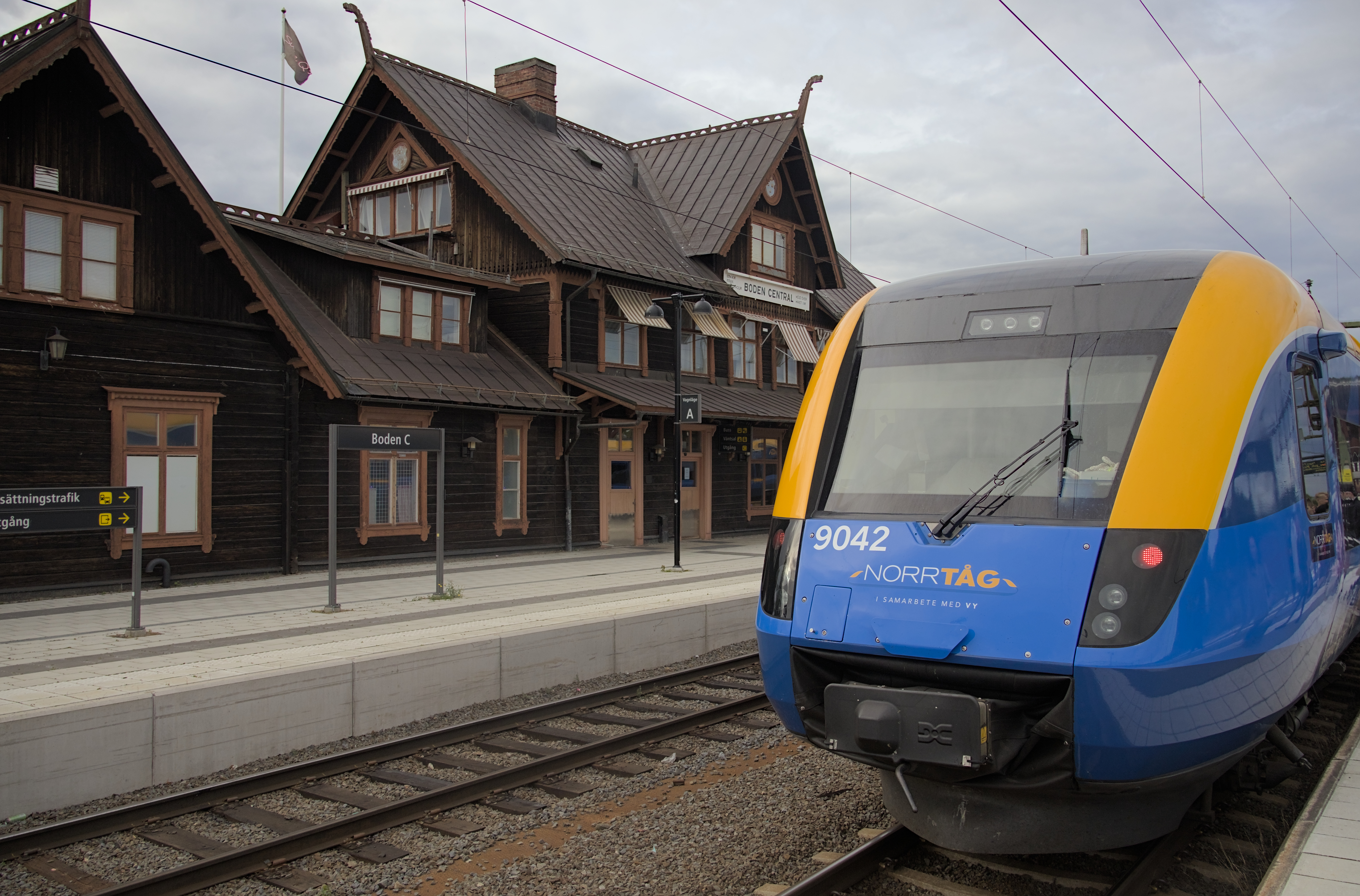
- Norrtåg train at Boden C

General information
- Location: Boden; Sweden
- Lines: Main line through Upper Norrland; Iron Ore Line; Haparanda Line

Other information
- Station code: Bdn
Location

Boden Central Station (Swedish: Bodens centralstation) is a railway station located in Boden, Sweden, first opened in 1894. The station is a major junction station on the Main line through Upper Norrland, Iron Ore Line and Haparanda Line. The station is served by the Norrtåg regional train network, and night trains between Stockholm C and Narvik. Passenger service on the Haparanda Line, which was previously terminated in 1992, was re-instated in 2022. The station also includes a large freight yard.

The listed station building was designed by architect Folke Zettervall. The building was expanded in 1917 and 1925, and is well-preserved.
