= LKAB Malmtrafik =

Swedish railway company

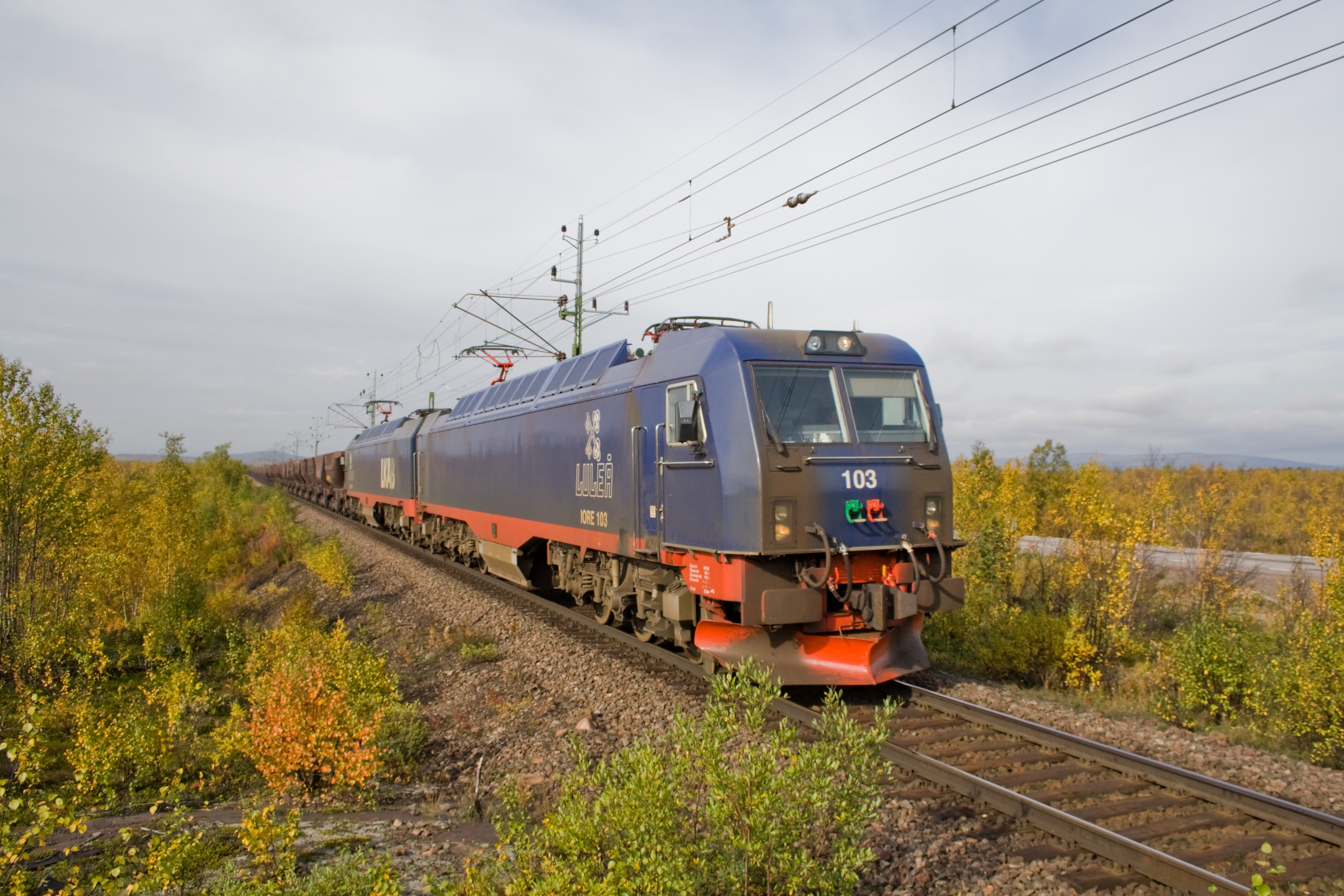
- Main lines: Iron Ore Line; Ofoten Line
- Fleet: 26 Iore
- Parent company: LKAB

Other
- Website: www.lkab.se

LKAB Malmtrafik, earlier Malmtrafik i Kiruna AB (MTAB), is a Swedish railway company which operates the iron ore freight trains on the Iron Ore Line and the Ofoten Line. MTAB is a wholly owned subsidiary of the state-owned mining company Luossavaara–Kiirunavaara (LKAB). In Norway, operations are handled by the subsidiary Malmtrafikk AS (MTAS). Malmtrafik hauls ore from LKAB's mines in Kiruna, Malmberget and Svappavaara to the ports of Luleå and Narvik, the latter located in Norway. The company owns 28 Iore locomotives and 750 hopper cars. Each train is 68 cars long and weighs 8,600 tonnes (8,500 long tons; 9,500 short tons), allowing the company to transport 33 million tonnes per year.

Traditionally the ore hauling had been done by the Swedish State Railways (SJ) and Norwegian State Railways (NSB). In the late 1980s, LKAB started a process to take over operations and increase efficiency by using heavier and longer trains. Because of the profitability in the operations, especially NSB was reluctant to lose the operations. In 1993, LKAB received permission to operate their own trains in Sweden, and from 1996 in Norway. MTAB and MTAS were created in 1996 when they took over the hauling formerly operated by NSB and SJ. It inherited Dm3 and El 15 locomotives. Originally established as a joint venture between LKAB, NSB and SJ, with the mining company as a majority owner, LKAB bought the whole company in 1999. By 2011, the renewal process will be finished, and only trains pulled by Iore will be in operation.

== History ==
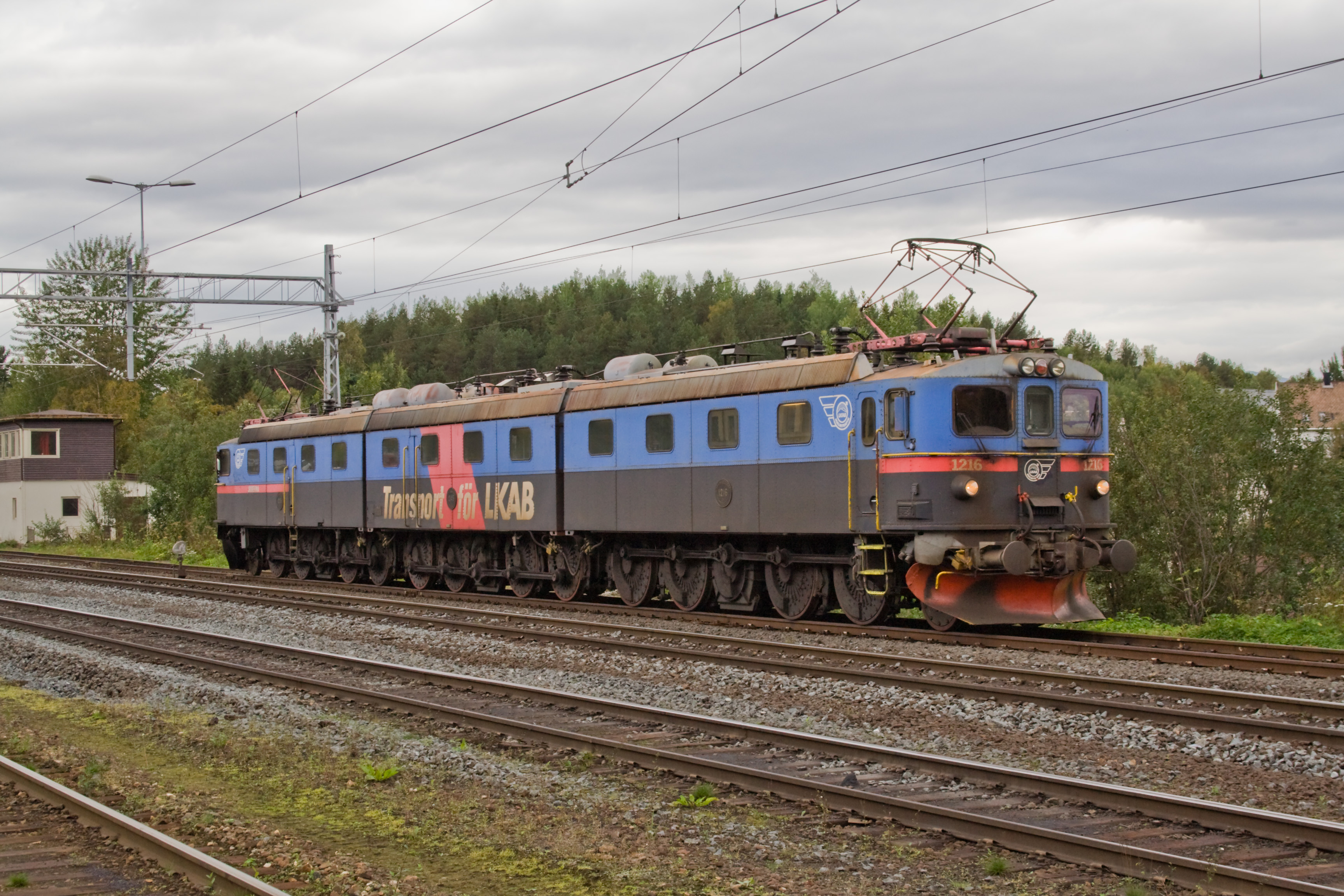
Dm3 in Narvik

=== Background ===
In 1884, LKAB's predecessor Gellivare Aktiebolag is granted concession for mining in Malmberget. Four years later, the first part of the Iron Ore Line, from Malmberget to Luleå, was completed. In 1889, the mining company filed for bankruptcy, and the Government of Sweden bought the line for 8 million Swedish krona (SEK), half the investment cost. Construction of the Ore Line and Ofoten Line from Gällivare to Narvik started in 1898 and was completed in 1902. In 1915, the section from Kiruna to Riksgränsen (on the Norway–Sweden border) is electrified, and by 1923 the whole section from Narvik to Luleå is electrified. In 1940, the Port of Narvik was bombed, and all export for the remainder of World War II went via Luleå. In 1957, the Government of Sweden bought LKAB.

Hauling of the ore trains along the Iron Ore Line and Ofoten Line has traditionally been operated by the two state railways, SJ and NSB, who have sold their services directly to LKAB. With dwindling profits in LKAB during the early 1980s, in 1983 LKAB used an arbitration to reduce its transport costs to SJ from 310 to 235 million per year, with subsequent discounts achieved with NSB. In 1988, LKAB demanded further efficiency improvement, and stated that both SJ and NSB were making large profits on the operations. A committee was established by both countries' transport ministries to find areas of improvement. During the 1970s and 1980s, the number of employees working on the ore logistics had been halved, and NSB stated that they did not believe there was much more room for higher efficiency. NSB had a 50% profit margin on the operations.

=== Establishment ===
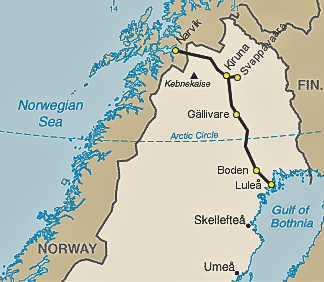
Map of the Ore Line and the Ofoten Line

In December 1991, LKAB stated that they wanted to take over the operation of the ore trains from NSB and SJ. At the time, they were paying 0.15 Swedish krona (SEK) per tonne kilometer in Sweden and 0.30 Norwegian krone (NOK) per tonne kilometer in Norway, while comparable rates abroad were between SEK 0.03 and 0.10 per tonne kilometer. While SJ had several times during the 1980s agreed to reduce their rates, NSB had not offered the same, and was making a profit of NOK 60 to 70 million per year. LKAB stated that they, by taking over operations themselves, could save SEK 200 million per year. In addition, they stated that they could save between SEK 50 to 100 million in auxiliary fields. LKAB had sent an application to Swedish authorities for permission to take over operations, and had received positive feedback from SJ. NSB, on the other hand, did not support a solution where they did not operate the trains themselves. LKAB stated that if an agreement with NSB could not be reached, they would shift all their transport to the Port of Luleå.

In February 1992, a report ordered by Kiruna Municipality recommended that LKAB, SJ and NSB create a common company to operate the ore trains. At the same time, SJ stated that the consequence of LKAB taking over operation could be that passenger trains on the lines would be terminated. In April 1992, LKAB was awarded traffic rights by the Swedish Rail Administration. There was a disagreement as to whether the agency had the authority to do this, and SJ stated that it was only the Ministry of Enterprise, Energy and Communications who had the authority to award traffic rights on the stem lines, in particular from Boden to Luleå. The rights also did not affect the Ofoten Line.

The following day, SJ and NSB stated that they were considering establishing a joint venture that would take over the operations of the ore trains. In May, LKAB stated that Norway would, through its membership in the European Economic Area, be required to allow any train operator to run trains on a line, while this was rejected by NSB who stated that this only applied within the European Union, of which Norway was not a member. In late May, NSB stated that they were able to cut costs by 25% and that they would reduce the price to LKAB more than this. LKAB rejected the proposal, and stated that NSB had shown their ability of restructuring too late. By August, SJ and NSB had offered to reduce the price from SEK 650 million to 450 million, but LKAB stated that they believed it was possible to reduce the costs further.

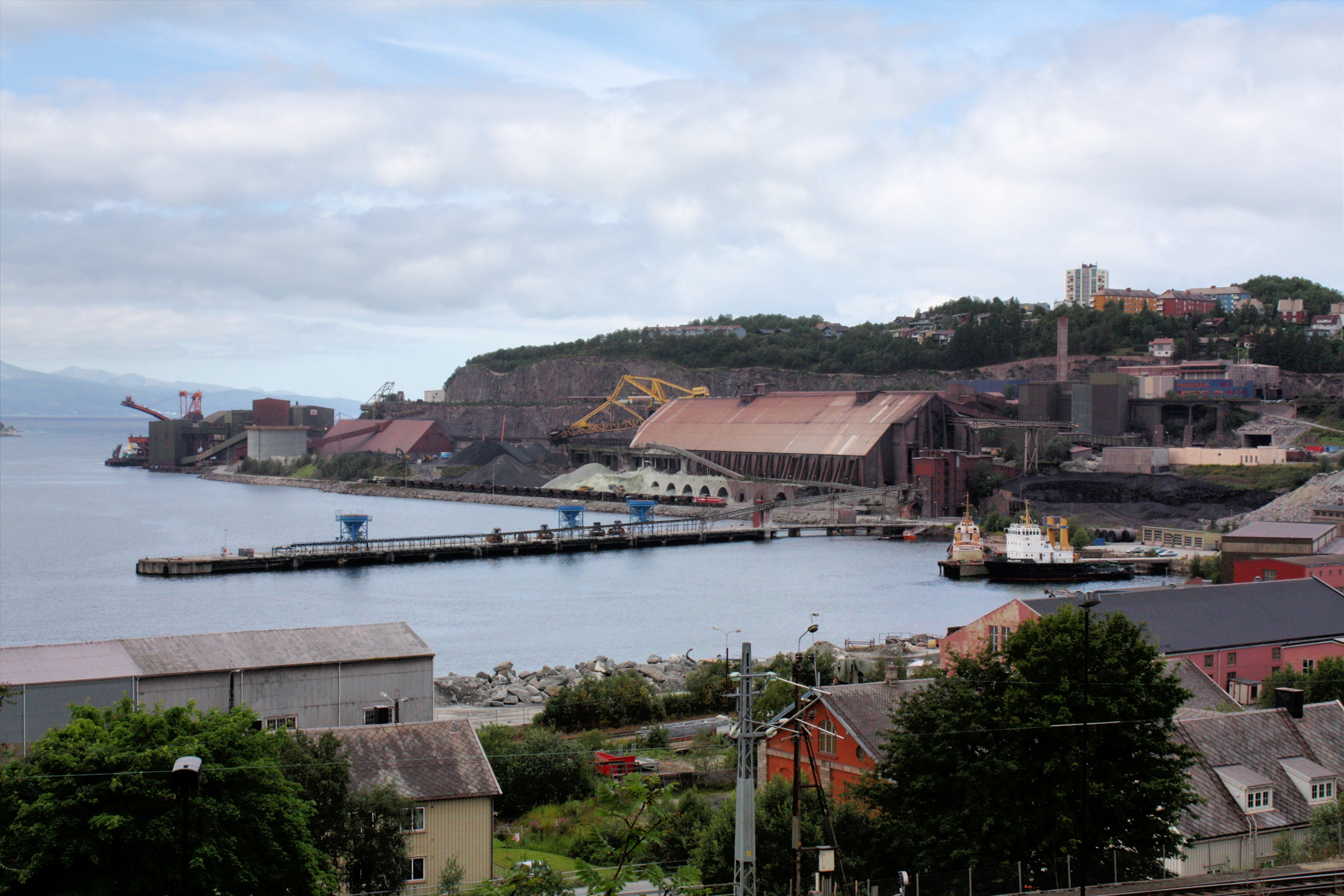
LKAB's facilities at the Port of Narvik

In September, Norwegian Minister of Transport and Communications Kjell Opseth from the Labour Party, stated that it would be "unfortunate" if LKAB should take over the operations. The Swedish Government stated that it was their intention to privatize LKAB. On 18 September, 3,000 in Narvik held a general strike against LKAB's plans. At the time it was not possible for NSB to fire redundant employees, at that the state agency would have to continue to pay their Narvik employees who would not be hired by LKAB, should the latter take over operations.

In October the Swedish Ministry of Communications gave the final permission for LKAB to take over operations in their own right. On 26 October, SJ and NSB signed a new five-year contract with LKAB where the latter would purchase transport services from the two state railway. The annual price had then been reduced from SEK 650 to 400 million. Political commentators stated that the agreement allowed LKAB to keep all the profit in the line and introduce new cost savings, while SJ and NSB kept face by keeping the operating contract. The price reduction would mean that both NSB and SJ would have to lay off employees.

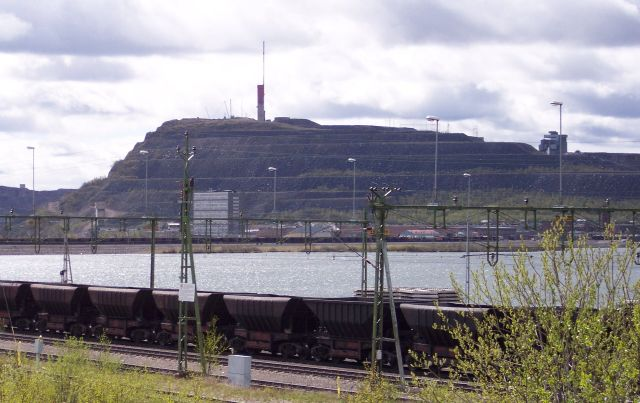
Hopper cars in Kiruna

In 1993, the state railways were losing money on the ore trains. In January 1994, SJ and NSB stated that they were going to merge the operations of the Iron Ore Line and the Ofoten Line. In May 1994, LKAB applied for traffic rights on the Ofoten Line. This was rejected in December by the Norwegian Ministry of Transport and Communications, who stated that the company did not meet the criteria in the law, including that the applicant had to have rail transport as their main activity.

In January 1995, it was proposed that a joint venture would be created between LKAB, SJ and NSB. The Norwegian Union of Railway Workers protested the proposal, and the Norwegian Centre Party stated that their feared this was the first step into converting NSB to a limited company. By February the negotiations were in a deadlock, and SJ and NSB stated that they were issuing an invitation to tender for a new class of locomotives. In March, LKAB again applied for permit to operate their own trains in Norway and stated that they would only join a joint venture if they were the majority owner. On 8 June, LKAB established a Swedish and a Norwegian subsidiary dedicated to rail transport. This would bypass the rationale provided by the Ministry of Transport in denying them traffic rights, and LKAB stated that there was no way the Norwegian authorities now could deny them such rights, given EU Directive 91/440.

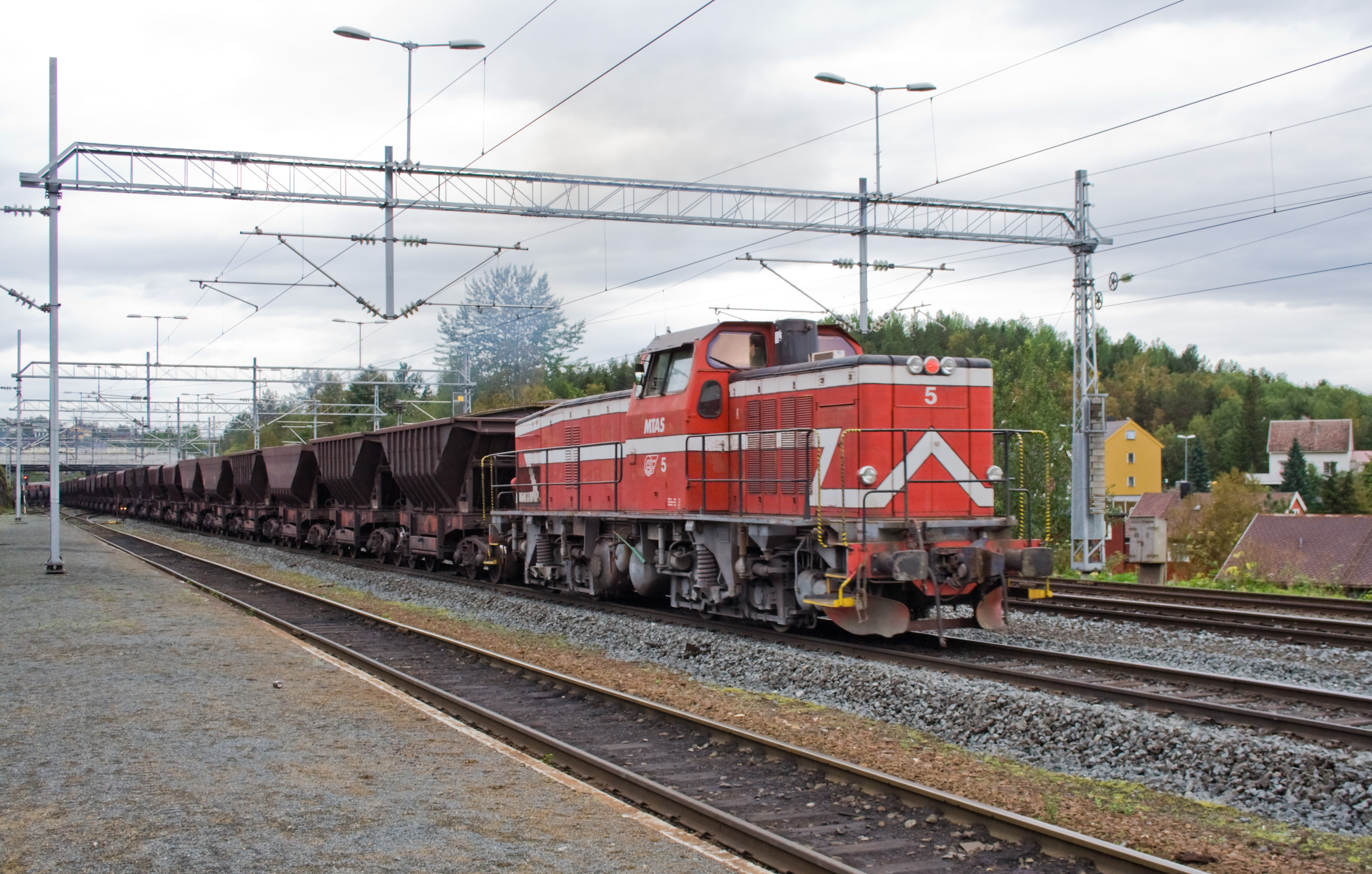
T44 locomotive shunting ore cars at the Port of Narvik

On 27 June, LKAB, SJ and NSB reached an agreement where the three would establish a joint venture owned 51% by LKAB and 24.5% each by NSB and SJ. At the time there were 350 employees in the three companies involved in the transport, and the new company would recruit its employees among these, although it would need significantly fewer employees. The plans called for the new companies taking over operations from 1 January 1996. The organization was protested by local labor unions in Narvik. In December, Kjell Opseth created a committee under the ministry, led by State Secretary Torstein Rudihagen of the Labour Party, which would look at the reorganization, thus postponing the date of the start of operations. In late January, the committee concluded that LKAB met the criteria to receive traffic rights. The report also showed that 55 jobs would be lost in Narvik and that the Norwegian Railway Inspectorate had concerns regarding the safety of LKAB's operations.

In Sweden, the labor unions protested after LKAB demanded that the employees switch union from Swedish Union for Service and Communications Employees to the Swedish Metalworkers Union. This was rejected by the workers, who would both have to reduce their pay and work five more years before retirement. In May the Opseth stated that the Norwegian Government would give the necessary rights to the joint venture. At the same time, the state would give Narvik Municipality economic support and real estate for commercial development. With Malktrafik's take-over, 50 employees, equally distributed between the two countries, became redundant. On 28 May, 22 train drivers, all Swedish, took out sick leave in protest towards being forced to switch labor union and receive lower wages and worse pension rights. This caused a third of the ore trains to be canceled.

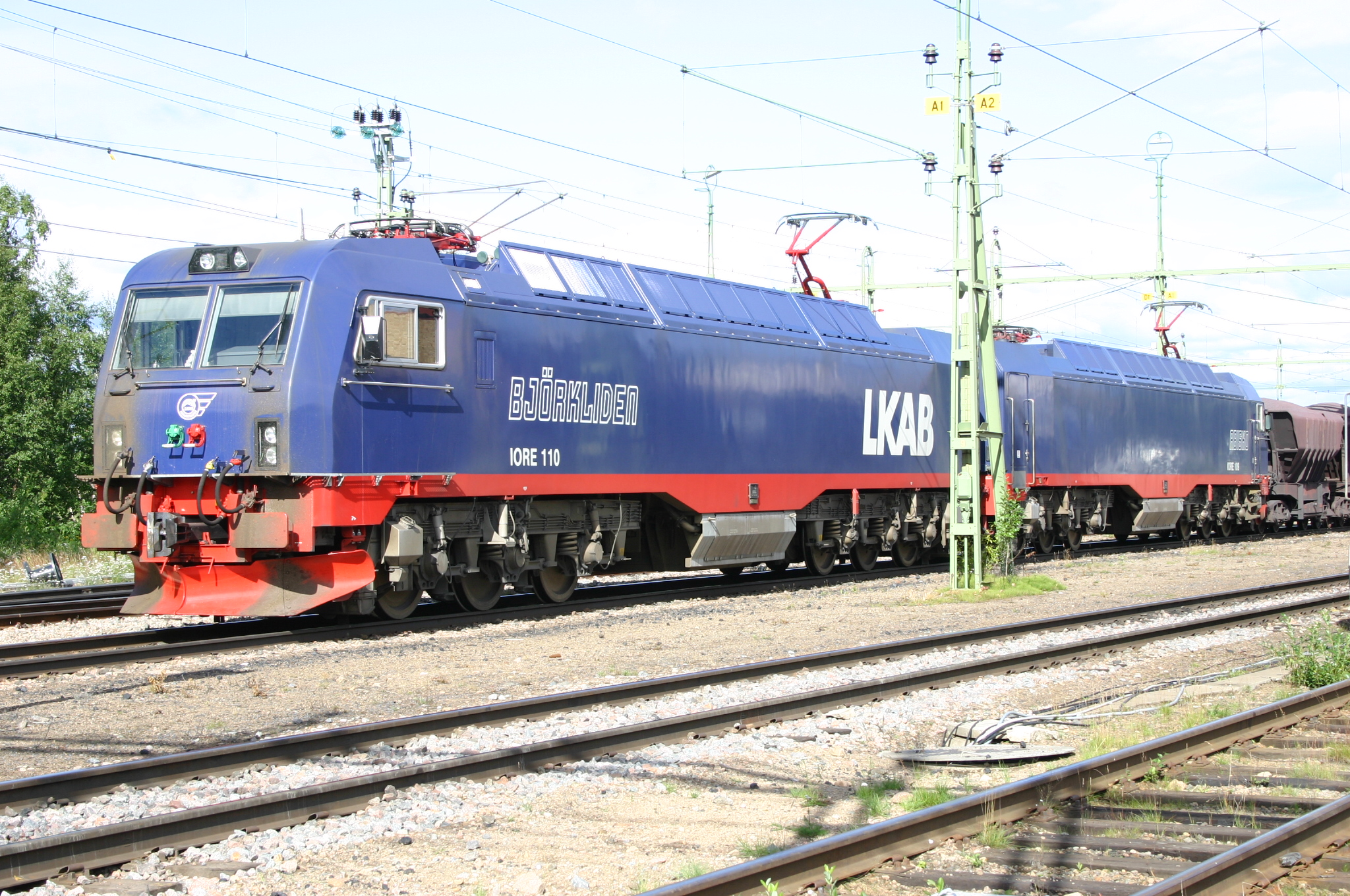
Twin Iore locomotives in Gällivare

On 28 June, the transfer of operations was finalized when the Labour Party, the Conservative Party and the Progress Party voted in the Parliament of Norway, with 67 against 45 votes, to grant Malmtrafik the necessary rights. The Centre Party, the Christian Democratic Party, the Socialist Left Party, the Liberal Party and the Red Electoral Alliance voted against. NSB's workshop and depot were to be transferred to a new company, Norsk Verkstedindustri, which was intended to create new jobs in Narvik.

=== Heavier trains ===
Malmtrafik took over operations from 1 July. The company bought the Dm3-locomotives from SJ, NSB's six El 15 locomotives, and a number of workshops, depots and shunters. Post-nationalization, it became the first private railway company in Europe to haul international freight trains. from 26 September to 27 October 200 employees in Narvik were on strike regarding the transition rules for employees. While the strike lasted, there was increased shipments to Luleå. In November, the new ore port in Luleå opened, having cost LKAB more than half a billion Swedish kronor and a capacity of six million tonnes of ore per year.

In 1998, LKAB estimated a gradual 35% increase in production until 2005, and demanded that the track owners grant sufficient funding to upgrade the lines from 25-tonne (25-long-ton; 28-short-ton) to 30-tonne (30-long-ton; 33-short-ton) maximum permitted axle load. Combined with new locomotives, this would give increased efficiency in hauling the ore. The upgrade for the Ofoten Line would cost 180 million Norwegian krone, and would allow LKAB to increase the train weight from 4,100 to 8,600 tonnes (4,000 to 8,500 long tons; 4,500 to 9,500 short tons). In addition, heavier trains would have to be longer, so sufficient passing loops would have to be upgraded to 790 metres (2,590 ft).

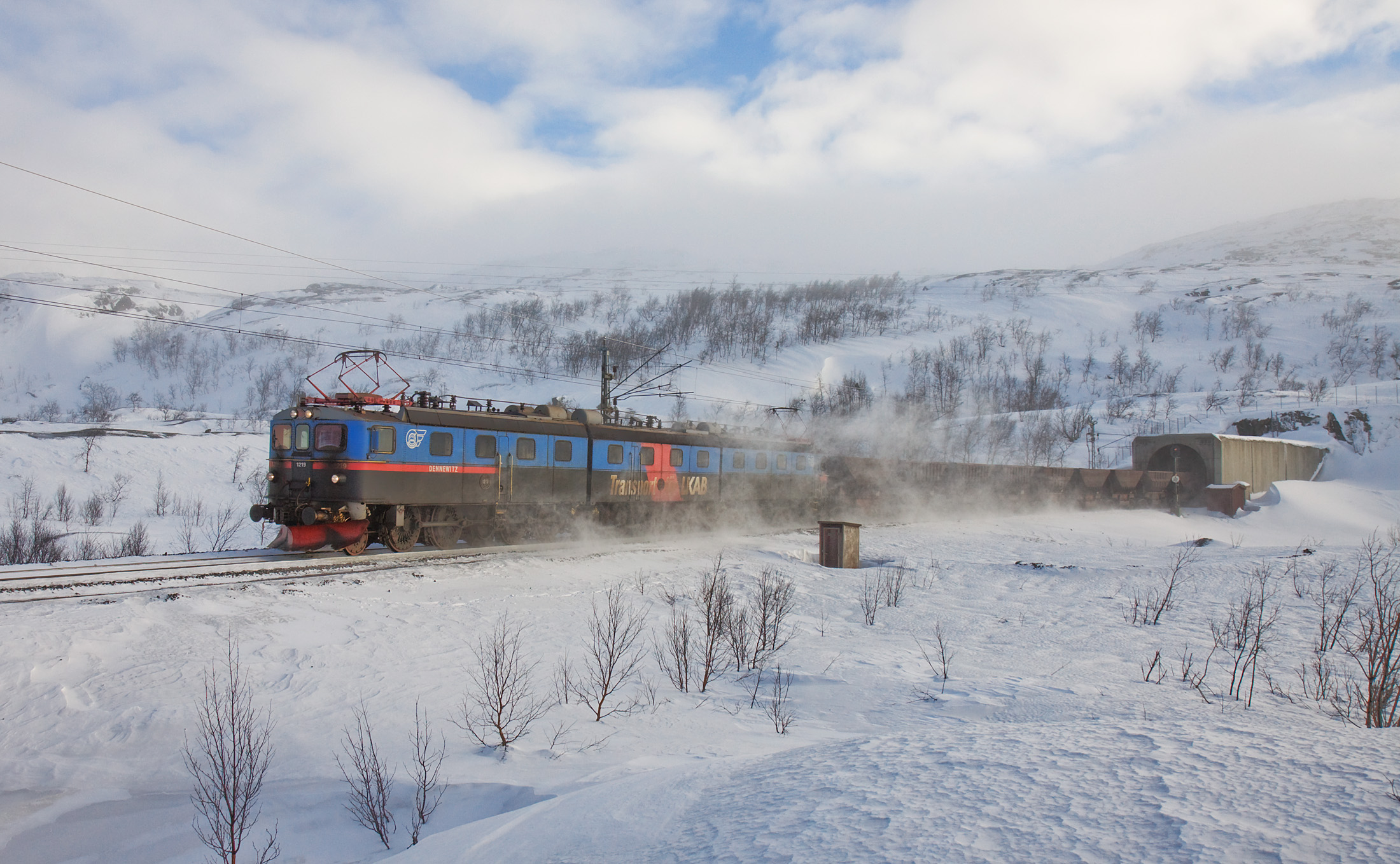
A Dm3 triple units

In March, LKAB awarded the contract to build 750 new 100-tonne hopper cars to Transnet of South Africa, after among others Norsk Verkstedindustri had been considered. In August, an agreement was reached whereby LKAB would pay for NOK 100 million of the NOK 130 million needed to upgrade the Ofoten Line. The contract to deliver 18 Iore locomotives was signed with Bombardier on 15 September 1998. LKAB bought SJ and NSB's share of MTAB in 1999, making MTAB a subsidiary.

The first twin unit locomotive was delivered in 2000, and serial delivery was made from 2002 to 2004. In 2003, the Iron Ore Line from Kiruna to Riskgränsen and the Ofoten Line were finished upgraded to 30 tonne axle load, allowing half the trains to operate with maximum capacity. In March 2004, LKAB decided to not purchase the option for additional hopper cars from Transnet, and instead purchase 750 heavier cars from K-Industrier. Since 1969 the ore trains have been using the Soviet SA3 coupler. However, LKAB decided that these were not sufficiently strong for the new trains and decided that the Iore locomotives and the new hopper cars were to be delivered with Janney couplers (also known as AAR coupler). While the first pair of locomotives had a Janney couplers, the rest of the first batch were equipped with SA3 couplers to handle the existing hopper cars, and then retrofitted with Janney couplers only to revert to SA3 later.

On 23 August 2007, LKAB ordered another four twin units, with delivery in 2010 and 2011, and costing €52 million. This will replace all remaining Dm3. After delivery, six locomotives are used from Kiruna to Luleå, and twenty are used from Kiruna to Narvik. By 2009, sufficient passing loops had been built along the whole line from Narvik to Luleå to allow all trains to operate with full capacity. By 2011, LKAB's will be able to replace all the Dm3, and convert all the trains to 68 cars. This will increase the capacity from 28 to 33 million tonnes per year, and at the same time reduce the number of departures per day from 21 to 15.

== Rolling stock ==
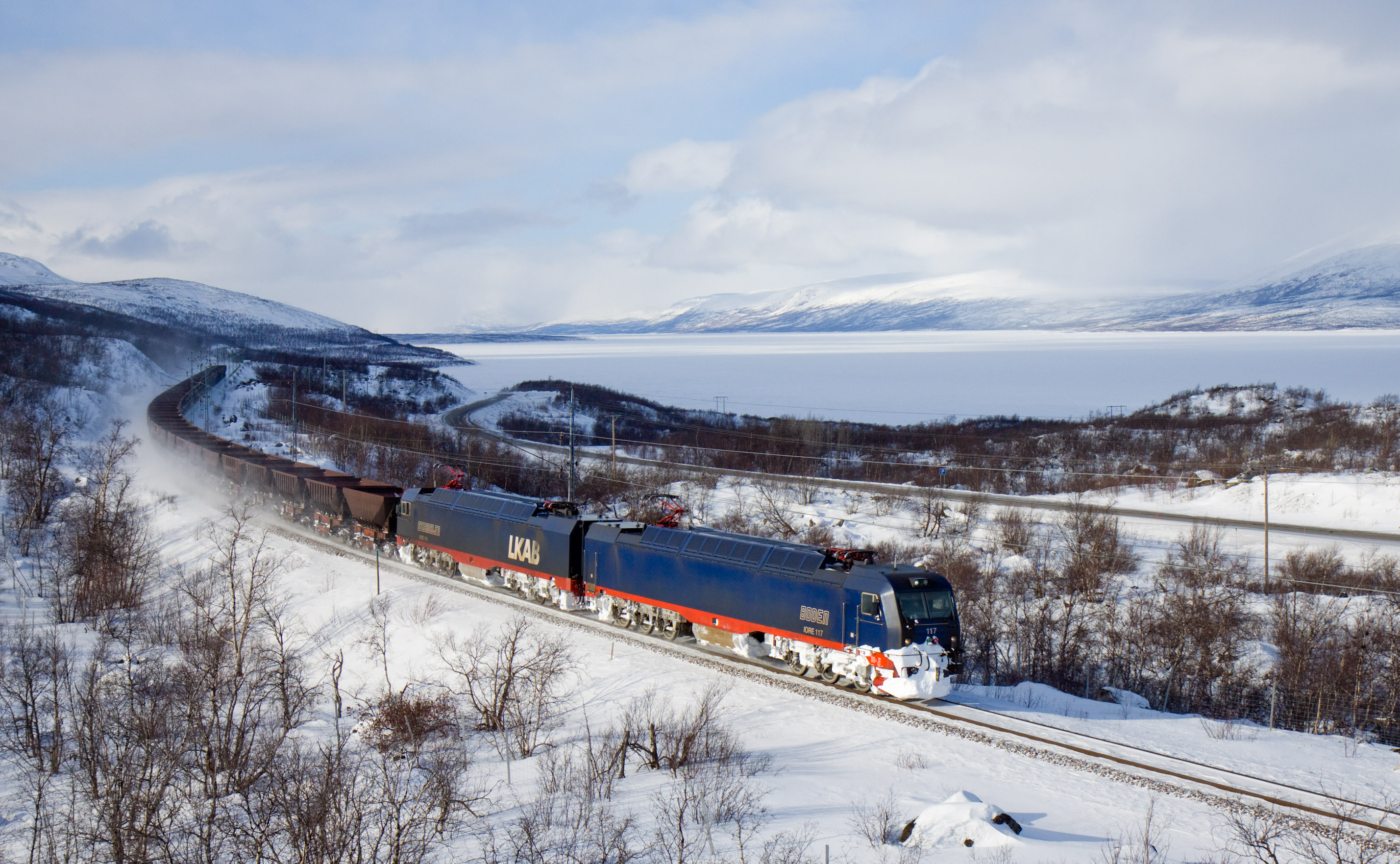
An Iore hauling an ore train near Torneträsk

=== Iore ===
Iore is a class of 26 modified TRAXX locomotive built by Bombardier Transportation between 2000 and 2011. Operating in pairs, each locomotive has a power output of 5,400 kilowatts (7,200 hp), a tractive effort of 600 kilonewtons (130,000 lb_{f}) and a maximum dynamic braking effort is 375 kilonewtons (84,000 lb_{f}). The locomotives have a Co'Co' wheel arrangement, are 22.905 meters (75 ft 1.8 in) long, 4.465 meters (14 ft 7.8 in) tall and 2.950 meters (9 ft 8.1 in) wide. Each locomotive weighs 180 tonnes (180 long tons; 200 short tons), of which 38 tonnes (37 long tons; 42 short tons) is electrical equipment. Each locomotive has 30 tonnes (30 long tons; 33 short tons) of dead weight to increase the locomotive's weight to the maximum axle weight, and further weight increase has been achieved by making the walls 4 centimetres (1.6 in) wide with armored steel. Diagnostic information is available to the driver and can be sent to the control center via GSM-R.

=== Hopper cars ===
Malmtrafik operates 750 hopper cars from two different manufacturers: Transnet and K-Industrier. Each hopper car has a loading capacity of 80 or 100 tonnes (79 or 98 long tons; 88 or 110 short tons), with a maximum permitted axle load of 30 tonnes (30 long tons; 33 short tons). Each train has 68 cars, although Malmtrafik has ordered six spare cars for each train. There are seven sets of cars for the Northern Circuit. The cars use a Janney coupler.

=== Former locomotives ===
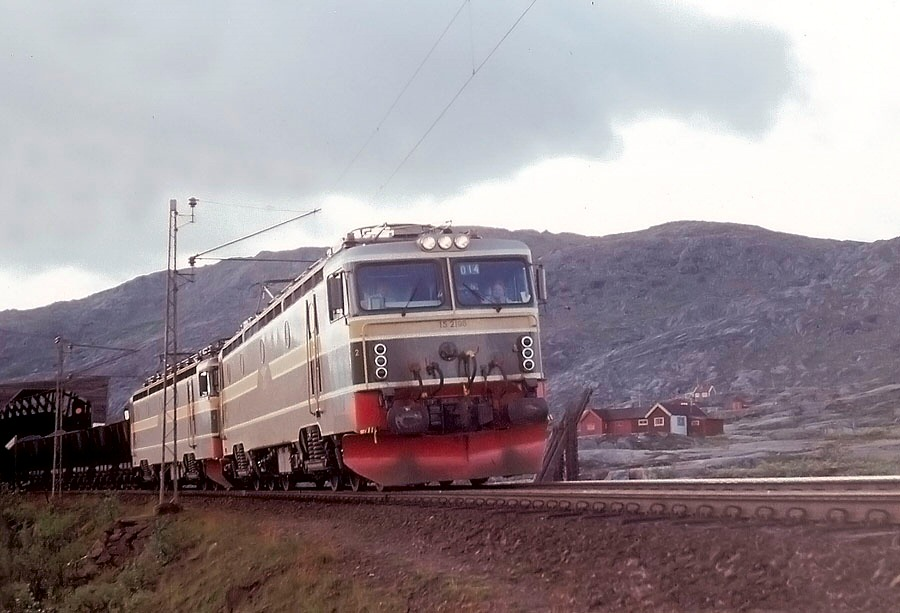
A pair of El 15 hauling an ore train

The Dm3 are a class of triple-locomotives delivered to SJ between 1952 and 1970. Each triple unit had a power output of 7,200 kilowatts (9,700 hp) and a 1'D+D+D'1 wheel arrangement. The locomotives were built by ASEA and Motala Verkstad. Each section is 13.2 meters (43 ft) long and weighs 95 tonnes (93 long tons; 105 short tons). The trains will be phased out with the delivery of the last Iore locomotives.

Six El 15 were delivered to NSB in 1967 and remained in use by Malmtrafik until 2004. They have a power output of 5,406 kilowatts (7,250 hp) and a Co'Co' wheel arrangement, and hauled ore trains in pairs. They were built by Thune, with the electrical components made by Per Kure. Each locomotive weighs 132 tonnes (130 long tons; 146 short tons) and is 19.2 meters (63 ft) long. The train is a more powerful adaption of the Swedish Rc locomotive. While the trains are as powerful as Iore, they have a lower tractive effort.

== Operation ==
LKAB operates iron ore mines in Kiruna, Svappavaara and Malmberget in Norrbotten County, Sweden. Most of the output is transported by rail to the ice-free Port of Narvik, a route named the Northern Circuit. The Port of Narvik has a capacity for 25 million tonnes per year of ore and allows ships of up to 250,000 deadweight tonnes (DWT). A minority of the ore is transported to the Port of Luleå, on a route named the Southern Circuit. Located on the Baltic Sea, ore via Luleå is shipped to Baltic customers, or delivered to furnaces operated by SSAB in Luleå and Oxelösund. The Port of Luleå has a capacity of 10 million tonnes per year, and allows ships up to 60,000 DWT. The Bay of Bothnia is covered in ice from January through May, and access to the port is secured through ice breakers.

The Ore and Ofoten Lines are 536 kilometres (333 mi) long, including the branch to Svappavaara, with the route from Kiruna to Narvik being 170 kilometres (110 mi), and from Malmberget to Luleå being 220 kilometres (140 mi). Operations are Malmtrafik i Kiruna (MTAB) in Sweden and by Malmtrafikk (MTAS) in Norway. Daily there operate 11 to 13 trains in each direction on the Northern Circuit, and five to six trains on the Southern Circuit. The trains hauled by Iore have 68 cars, are 750 meters (2,460 ft) long and weigh 8,600 tonnes (8,500 long tons; 9,500 short tons). The full ore trains operate at 60 kilometres per hour (37 mph), while the empty return trains operate at 70 kilometres per hour (43 mph).

Although the trains and hopper cars are all owned by LKAB, the Iron Ore Line is owned by the Swedish Transport Administration and the Ofoten Line by Bane NOR. The lines are single track, electrified at 15 kV 16.7 Hz AC and have automatic train protection. The Ore and Ofoten Lines are both also used by passenger and container trains. Malmtrafik's haulage constitutes the majority of train cargo in Norway, measured in tonnes, although not in tonne kilometers.
