= LKAB =

Swedish mining company, established 1890

Luossavaara-Kiirunavaara Aktiebolag
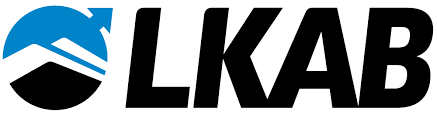
- Type: Government-owned
- Industry: Mining
- Founded: 1890; 136 years ago
- Headquarters: Luleå, Sweden
- Area served: Worldwide
- Key people: Anders Borg (chairman of the board); Jan Moström (president CEO)
- Products: Iron ore; Minerals
- Revenue: ▼42.923 billion SEK
- Operating income: ▼16.230 billion SEK
- Net income: ▼15.220 billion SEK
- Total assets: ▲106.948 billion SEK
- Total equity: ▲80.861 billion SEK
- Owner: Government of Sweden (100%)
- Number of employees: ~4,640
- Parent: Government Office of Sweden
- Divisions: Minerals Division; The Mining Division; Special Business Division
- Subsidiaries: LKAB Berg & Betong; LKAB Fastigheter; LKAB Kimit; LKAB Malmtrafik; LKAB Mekaniska; LKAB Minerals; LKAB Norge AS; LKAB Wassara; LKAB Försäkring; LKAB Nät; LKAB Schwedenerz GmbH
- Website: LKAB.com
- Footnotes; Data from the 2023 Year End Communiqué except where otherwise indicated.

Luossavaara-Kiirunavaara Aktiebolag (LKAB) is a state-owned Swedish mining company. The company mines iron ore at Kiruna and at Malmberget in northern Sweden. The company was established in 1890, and has been 100% state-owned since 1976. The iron ore is processed to pellets and sinter fines, which are transported by Iore trains (Malmbanan) to the harbours at Narvik and Luleå and to the steel mill at Luleå (SSAB). Their production is sold throughout much of the world, with the principal markets being European steel mills, as well as North Africa, the Middle East and Southeast Asia. LKAB's mines supply at least 80% of Europe's iron ore.

== History ==
The company became state-owned in 1907.

== Operations ==
As of 2021, LKAB has over 4,500 employees in 12 countries. There are iron ore mines, processing plants and ore harbors in northern Sweden and Norway, and a sales office in Germany. LKAB has subsidiaries for industrial minerals with processing plants in Sweden, Finland, the UK, the Netherlands, Turkey and China. Additional subsidiaries are in Germany, the US and Hong Kong as well as representative offices in Slovakia, Greece, Spain and South Africa.

LKAB's chief assets are among the magnetite orefields of northern Sweden. Its corporate headquarters are in Luleå and the main production sites are in Kiruna (Kiruna Mine) and Malmberget, close to Gällivare. The ore is partially processed on site, and is transported by freight train on Malmbanan to either Narvik or Luleå depending on final destination. LKAB has been ranked as among the 14th best of 92 oil, gas, and mining companies on indigenous rights and resource extraction in the Arctic. In 2021, LKAB was ranked no. 23 out of 120 oil, gas, and mining companies involved in resource extraction north of the Arctic Circle in the Arctic Environmental Responsibility Index (AERI). In 2026, LKAB found 7 billion tonnes of mineable iron ore, more than has been mined so far.

In January 2023, LKAB informed that the largest deposit of rare earth elements known in Europe to date has been discovered in northern Sweden. According to the announcement, the deposit contains over one million tonnes of material, which could be mined. Approval procedures in industry often take ten years in Sweden. It is likely to take at least ten to 15 years before mining can actually begin and raw materials can be brought to market. In LKAB Report 2024, LKAB President and CEO Jan Moström wrote: "We are making efforts to use more of the materials we already mine in order to extract phosphorus and rare earth elements – critical minerals that are crucial for society."

== Timeline ==
- 1890 LKAB is founded.
- 1891 AB Gellivare Malmfält founded.
- 1893 AB Gellivare Malmfält bought LKAB.
- 1899 Ore line from the south reaches Kiruna.
- 1957 The government takes over LKAB to 96%. Traffic Grangesberg-Oxelosund (TGO) retains 4%.
- 1976 LKAB becomes a government-owned corporation.

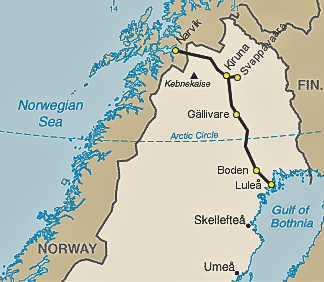
Iron ore is extracted in Kiruna, Svappavaara and Malmberget (outside of Gällivare), and brought by rail to the harbors of Luleå and Narvik.

== Sponsorships ==
LKAB sponsors Swedish cross-country skiers Marcus Hellner and Charlotte Kalla.

== See also ==
- Swedish iron ore during World War II
