= SJ Dm3 =

Class of electric locomotives

Dm
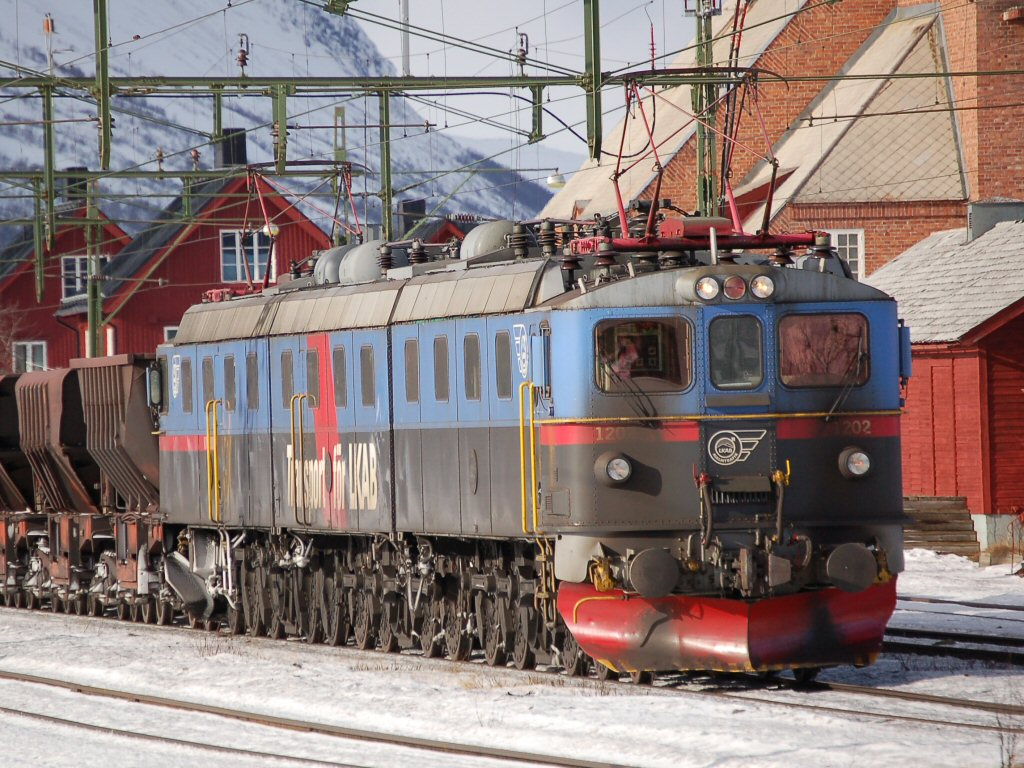
- A Dm3 in MTAB colors at Abisko Östra
Type and origin
- Power type: Electric
- Builder: ASEA
- Build date: 1954-1971
- Total produced: 97; 20 Dm+Dm; 19 Dm+Dm3+Dm
Specifications
- Configuration
  - UIC: 1′D+D1′ (Dm); 1′D+D+D1′ (Dm3)
- Gauge: 1,435 mm (4 ft 8 1/2 in)
- Wheel diameter: 1,530 mm (5 ft 0.24 in)
- Length: 25,100 mm (82 ft 4 1/4 in) (Dm); 35,250 mm (115 ft 7 3/4 in) (Dm3)
- Loco weight: 190 t (187.0 long tons; 209.4 short tons); 273.2 t (268.9 long tons; 301.2 short tons)
- Electric system/s: 15 kV 16.7 Hz AC catenary
- Current pickup: Pantograph
Performance figures
- Maximum speed: 75 km/h (47 mph)
- Power output: 4,800 kW (6,400 hp) (Dm); 7,200 kW (9,700 hp) (Dm3)
- Tractive effort: 940 kN (210,000 lb_{f}) (Dm3)
Career
- Disposition: Replaced by IORE from 2010s

Dm and Dm3 is a series of locomotives used by Swedish State Railways (Swedish: Statens Järnvägar, SJ) and later Malmtrafik i Kiruna (MTAS) for pulling iron ore trains on the Iron Ore Line in Sweden and Ofoten Line in Norway. A total of 39 double-locomotives (Dm) were delivered between 1954 and 1971, built by ASEA. A further 19 center locomotives (Dm3) were later delivered. Norwegian State Railways also operated 12 similar locomotives, designated NSB El 12. The Dm is an articulated, freight-optimized version of the Da-locomotive.

== History ==
The iron ore trains on the Iron Ore Line between Luleå in Sweden and Narvik in Norway were originally operated by the Of class locomotives, based on the earlier O-series locomotives first used on the line from 1914. In order to replace these locomotives, SJ chose to order new locomotives for the Iron Ore Railway based on the new Da class locomotives being ordered at the time. An initial twenty-four twin-section locomotives, designated the Dm class, were ordered and delivered in 1953, with a further fifteen fitted with new, more powerful motors, delivered in the 1960s. As a result of this, four locomotives from the first batch were fitted with the more powerful motors to match.

As initially developed, the twin-section Dm class locomotives were capable of pulling 3,400 tonne trains. However, due to progressive increases in train size and weight this was no longer acceptable by the end of the 1960s, and so SJ ordered 19 new cabless centre locomotives, which were installed permanently between the two halves of a Dm class locomotive; the resulting rebuild being classed as Dm3. Due to the addition of the centre locomotive, the Dm3 class locomotives were able to haul trains up to 5,400 tonnes. Around the same time, the locomotive cabs were modernised with new, rationalised control layouts and additional noise insulation. Rather than copy its neighbour, the Norwegian State Railway chose to build a different and more powerful locomotive, the NSB El 15 to modernise its operations around the same time.

In the 1980s, the majority of the remaining Dm class locomotives were moved to other locations on the SJ network, leaving the Dm3 class locomotives to operate the Iron Ore Line. All of the Dm3 and several Dm class units passed with the Iron Ore Line to the private company MTAB in 1996, with the remaining Dm class units being reclassified Dm2. With further increases in train size, MTAB decided to order new locomotives to replace the older Dm2 and Dm3 units. With the arrival of the first new IORE locomotives in 2000, the entire Dm2 class were removed from service along with several Dm3 class locomotives. In 2004 one set was donated to the heritage society Malmbanans Vänner, who also own one of the similar-design Norwegian El 12 class locomotives as used on the Iron Ore Railway. MTAB have since agreed that the remaining Dm3 class locomotives will be retired in 2011, when enough IORE locomotives are available to relieve them.

== Table ==
All MTAB locomotives are named after one of the mines of the LKAB.

Number	Name	Image	Remark
974-983-975	Malte		initially only Dm2 (974-975); 1999 rebuilt to Dm 3 with mid engine of 982-983-984. 2002 scrapped
976-977-978	Bruno		no modernisation, since 2002 historical locomotive
979-980-981			1993 scrapped
982-983-984			1996 out of service, 1999 mid engine 983 used in Dm2 974/975
1201-1231-1202	Kunigunda		
1203-1233-1204	- - -		1988 out of service and used as spare part locomotive, 1991 scrapped
1205-1235-1206	Sigrid		
1207-1232-1208	Sofia		Dm3 Sofia
1209-1234-1210	Viktor		
1211-1236-1212	Konsuln		
1213-1237-1214	Johan		since 2004 out of service
1215-1245-1216	Josefina		
1217-1238-1218	Hermelin		
1219-1239-1220	Dennewitz		
1221-1240-1222	-		19-03-1993 accident in Katterat (N), scrapped at place and removed from the SJ rolling stock register in November 1993.
1223-1241-1224	Baron		
1225-1242-1226	Alliansen		
1227-1243-1228	Kapten		
1229-1244-1230	Rektorn		
1246-1247-1248	Oskar		since 2013 historical locomotive
