= Iron Ore Line =

Railway line in northern Sweden

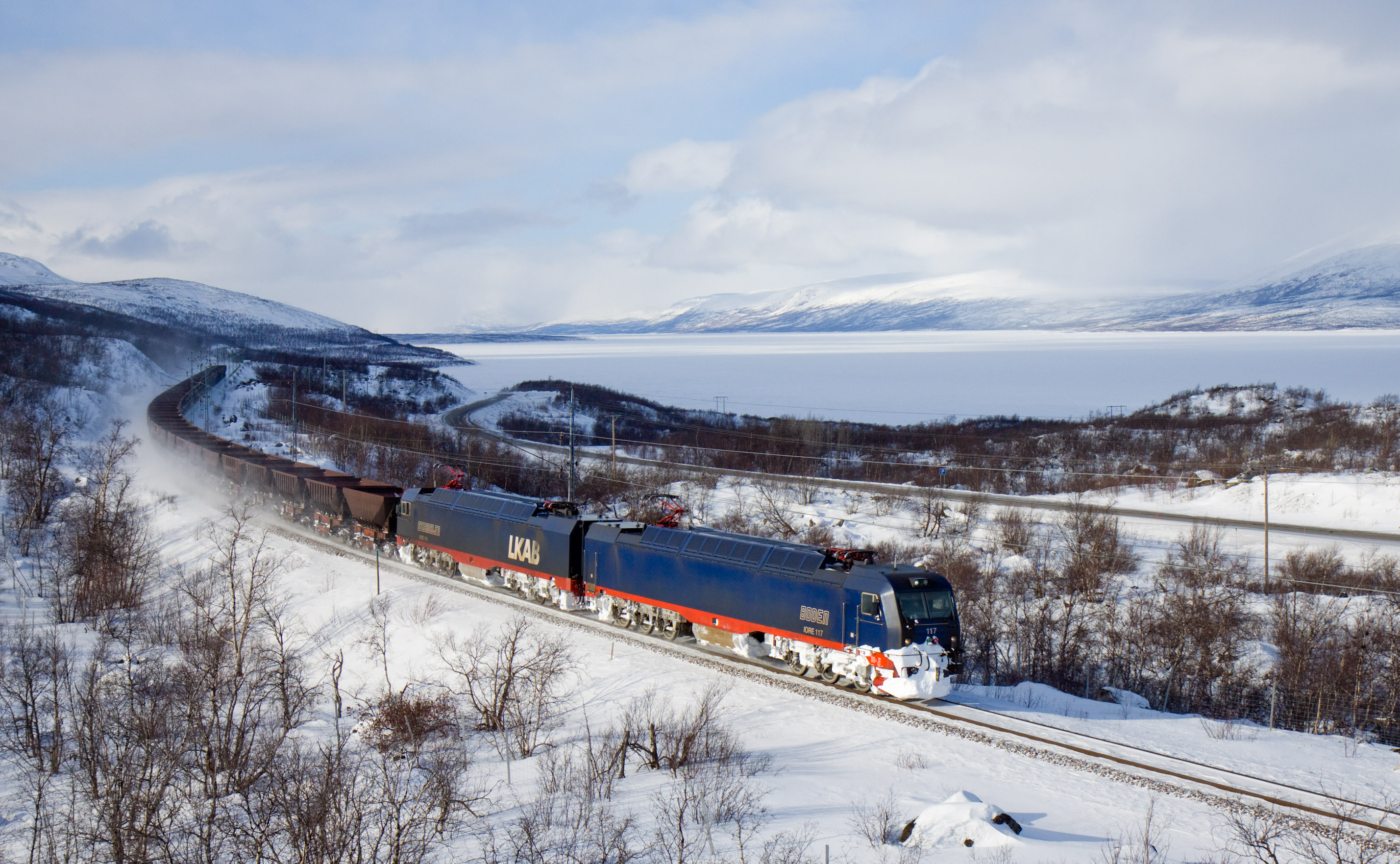
- A Malmtrafik Iore-hauled train at Torneträsk

Overview
- Native name: Malmbanan
- Owner: Swedish Transport Administration
- Locale: Norrbotten County, Sweden
- Termini: Boden Central Station; Riksgränsen Station

Service
- Type: Railway
- System: Swedish railway network
- Operator(s): Malmtrafik; CargoNet; Vy Tåg

History
- Opened: 1888

Technical
- Line length: 398 km (247 mi)
- Number of tracks: Single
- Character: Passenger and freight
- Track gauge: 1,435 mm (4 ft 8 1/2 in) standard gauge
- Electrification: 15 kV 16.7 Hz AC
- Operating speed: Passenger: 135 km/h (85 mph); Freight (Empty): 70 km/h (43 mph); Freight (Loaded): 60 km/h (37 mph)
- Highest elevation: 540 m (1,770 ft)

The Iron Ore Line (Swedish: Malmbanan) is a 398-kilometre (247 mi) long railway line between Riksgränsen and Boden in Norrbotten County, Sweden, owned by Trafikverket (the Swedish Transport Administration). The line also contains two branches, from Kiruna to Svappavaara and from Gällivare to Koskullskulle. The term is often colloquially used to also include the Ofoten Line, from Riksgränsen to Narvik in Norway, and the northernmost part of the main line through Upper Norrland from Boden to Luleå. The railway from Narvik to Luleå is 473 kilometres (294 mi) long.

The line is dominated by the 8,600-tonne (8,500-long-ton; 9,500-short-ton) ore freight trains operated by LKAB's subsidiary Malmtrafik from their mines to the Port of Narvik and the Port of Luleå. In addition, Vy Tåg operates passenger trains and CargoNet operates container freight trains. The Iron Ore Line is single track, electrified at 15 kV 16.7 Hz AC and has a permitted axle load of 30 tonnes (30 long tons; 33 short tons). The Swedish part of the line is the northernmost railway in Sweden and the Norwegian part outside Narvik is the northernmost railway in the whole of Western Europe at 68.452°N.

The first section of the line, from Gällivare to Luleå, opened in 1888. By 1899, the line was extended to Kiruna, and from 1903, all the way to Narvik. Electrification took place between 1915 and 1923. Operations of the ore trains was taken over by Malmtrafik from SJ in 1996.

Rockfalls from mountains have at times hit the line.

== Operations ==
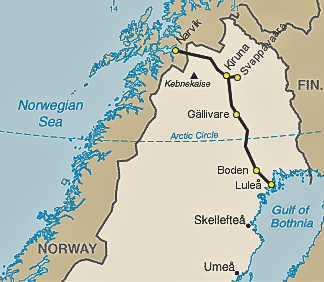
Map of the Iron Ore Line

LKAB operates iron ore mines in Kiruna, Svappavaara and Malmberget in Norrbotten County, Sweden. Most of the output is transported by rail to the ice-free Port of Narvik, a route named the Northern Circuit. A minority of the ore is transported to Luleå on the Southern Circuit. Located on the Baltic Sea, ore is shipped to Baltic customers, or delivered to furnaces operated by SSAB in Luleå and Oxelösund. The Ore and Ofoten Lines are 536 kilometres (333 mi) long, including the branch to Svappavaara, with the route from Kiruna to Narvik being 170 kilometres (110 mi), and from Malmberget to Luleå being 220 kilometres (140 mi). Operations are handled by LKAB's subsidiary Malmtrafik i Kiruna (MTAB) in Sweden, and Malmtrafikk (MTAS) in Norway. Daily there operate 11 to 13 trains in each direction on the Northern Circuit, and five to six trains on the Southern Circuit.

The trains hauled by Iore-class locomotives are 68 cars long and weigh 8,600 tonnes (8,500 long tons; 9,500 short tons). From Riksgränsen on the national border to the Port of Narvik, the trains use only a fifth of the power they regenerate. The regenerated energy is sufficient to power the empty trains back up to the national border. Although the trains and hopper cars are all owned by LKAB, the line is owned by the Swedish Transport Administration and the Norwegian National Rail Administration. The Ore and Ofoten Lines are also used by passenger and container trains.

Iron ore is also transported from Northland Resources' mine in Kaunisvaara to Narvik, started in small scale December 2012.

CargoNet operates two daily container trains from Alnabru Terminal in Oslo, Norway, named the Arctic Rail Express (ARE). The trains operate via Sweden and take 27 hours. The trains haul mostly food northbound and fish southbound along a distance of 1,950 kilometres (1,210 mi). DB Schenker launched a competing service in January 2011. There is about 0.5 million tonnes of non-ore freight transport on the Ofoten Line each year.

As of April 2026, SJ operates a single daily train from Narvik to Luleå Central Station or Stockholm Central Station. Travel time from Narvik to Kiruna is 3 hours and 1 minute, and travel time to Luleå is 7 hours and 4 minutes.

== History ==
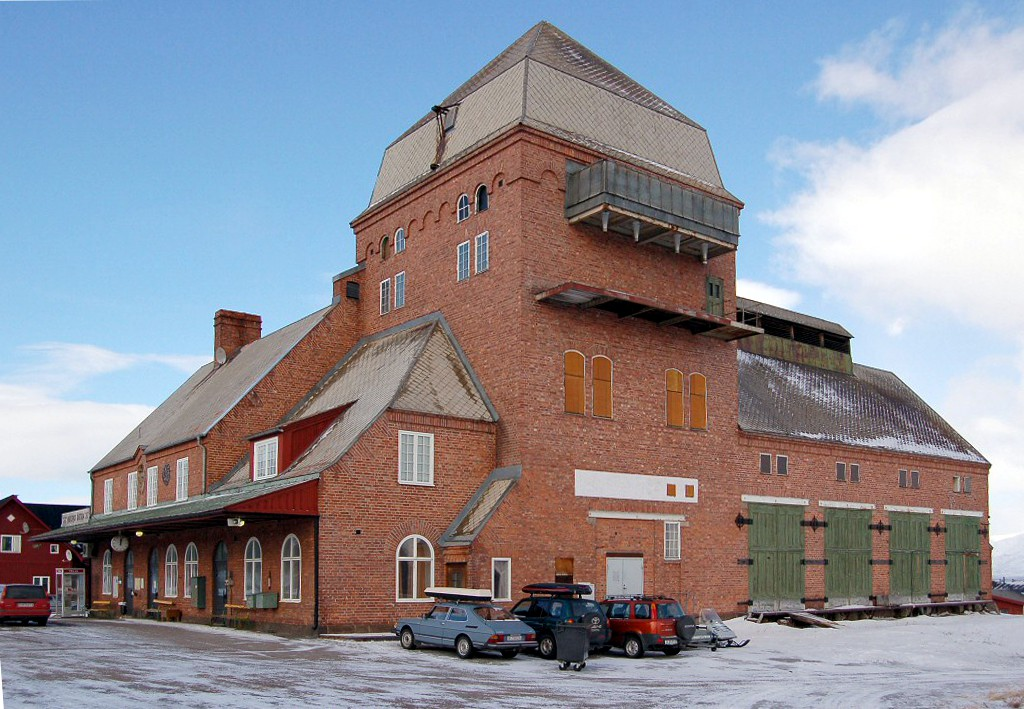
Abisko East Station

In 1847, a concession was granted to build a railway from the mines at Gällivare to Töre in the Gulf of Bothnia. The line was never built, and in 1882 a new concession was granted to an English company, who between 1884 and 1888 built a railway from Malmberget to the port at Svartön in Luleå. However, the line was built with an inadequate standard, and the mining company lacked sufficient funds to finance the upgrades. In 1891, the line was nationalized and taken over by the Swedish State Railways.

In 1890, Luossavaara–Kiirunavaara AB was established to start mining in Kiruna. By 1899, a railway had been built from Kiruna to Gällivare. In 1898, the Riksdag passed legislation to build a railway from Kiruna to Narvik in Norway. The line was completed in November 1902 and was officially opened on 14 July 1903 by King Oscar II. To begin with, the line used two or three conventional steam locomotives for each ore train. Later dedicated ore-hauling steam locomotives were introduced.

In 1915, the section from Riksgränsen to Kiruna was electrified, with the rest of the line electrified in 1922. The first electric locomotives were Oa, and allowed trains weighing 1,900 tonnes (1,870 long tons; 2,090 short tons). In the 1950s, SJ introduced the Dm locomotives, which could haul a 3,000 tonnes (2,950 long tons; 3,310 short tons) train. By the 1960s, the Dm had been rebuilt to Dm3, which consisted of a new center section. In combination of upgrades to 25 tonnes (24.6 long tons; 27.6 short tons) maximum permitted axle load, this gave a maximum train weight of 5,000 tonnes (4,920 long tons; 5,510 short tons).

In 1964, the branch from Kiruna to Svappavaara was opened, allowing LKAB to exploit mining there, although this was again closed in 1983. In 1990, a tunnel opened under Nuolja between Abisko and Björkliden. Passenger trains were essential for the region until 1984, when European Route E10 was constructed between Kiruna and Narvik.

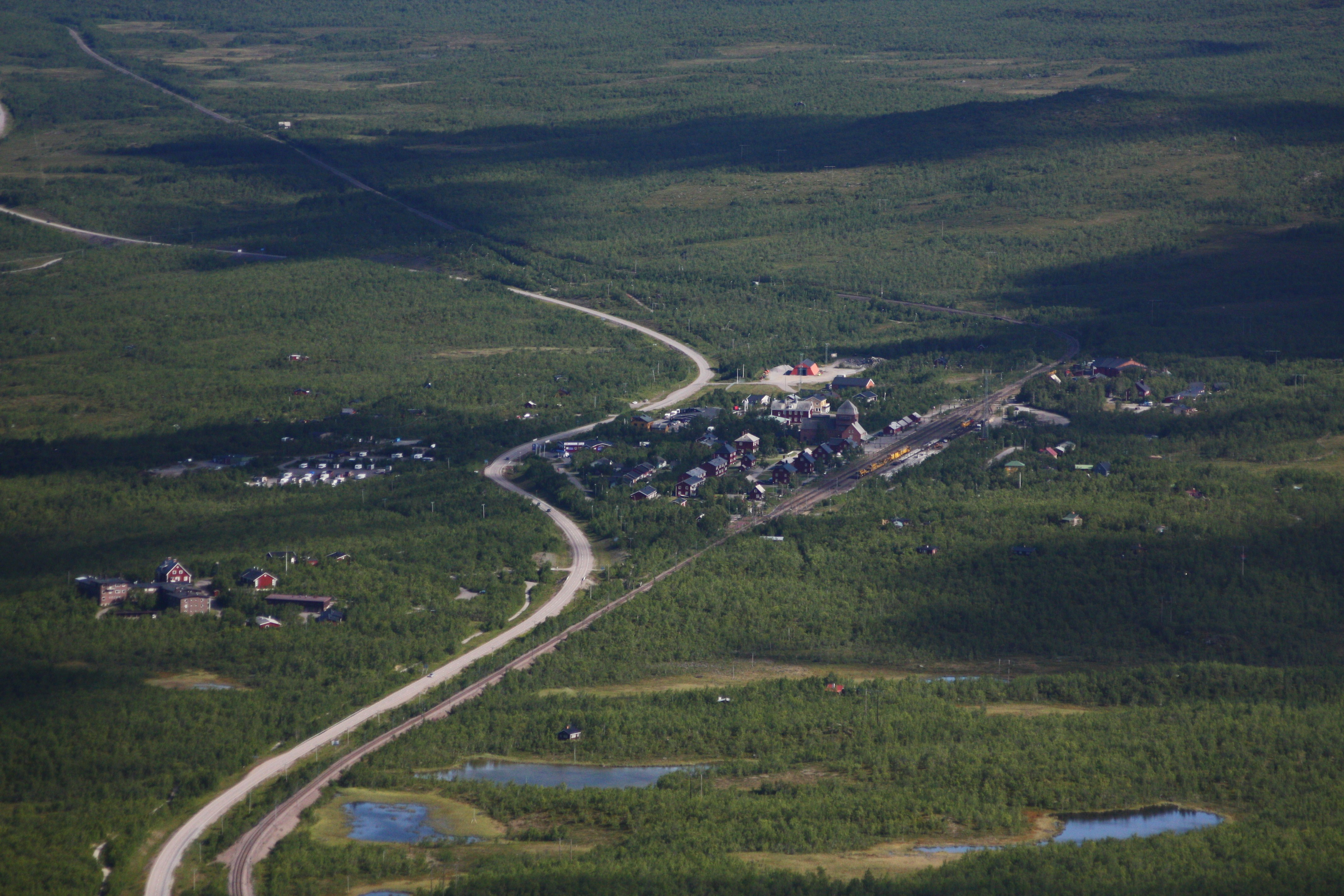
Abisko

=== Establishment of Malmtrafik ===
In December 1991, LKAB stated that they wanted to take over the operation of the ore trains from NSB and SJ. This became possible due to new legislation. At the time, they were paying 0.15 Swedish krona (SEK) per tonne kilometer in Sweden and 0.30 Norwegian krone (NOK) per tonne kilometer in Norway, while comparable rates abroad were between SEK 0.03 and 0.10 per tonne kilometer. While SJ had several times during the 1980s agreed to reduce their rates, NSB had not offered the same, and was making a profit of NOK 60 to 70 million per year. LKAB stated that they, by taking over operations themselves, could save SEK 200 million per year. In addition, they stated that they could save between SEK 50 to 100 million in auxiliary fields. LKAB had sent an application to Swedish authorities for permission to take over operations, and had received positive feedback from SJ. NSB, on the other hand, did not support a solution where they did not operate the trains themselves. LKAB stated that if an agreement with NSB could not be reached, they would shift all their transport to the Port of Luleå.

In February 1992, a report ordered by Kiruna Municipality recommended that LKAB, SJ and NSB create a common company to operate the ore trains. At the same time, SJ stated that the consequence of LKAB taking over operation could be that passenger trains on the lines would be terminated. In April 1992, LKAB was awarded traffic rights by the Swedish Rail Administration. There was a disagreement as to whether the agency had the authority to do this, and SJ stated that it was only the Ministry of Enterprise, Energy and Communications who had the authority to award traffic rights on the stem lines, in particular along the Main Line in Upper Norrland. The rights also did not affect the Ofoten Line.

The following day, SJ and NSB stated that they were considering establishing a joint venture that would take over the operations of the ore trains. In May 1992, LKAB stated that Norway would, through its membership in the European Economic Area, be required to allow any train operator to run trains on a line, while this was rejected by NSB who stated that this only applied within the European Union, of which Norway was not a member. By August, SJ and NSB had offered to reduce the price from SEK 650 million to 450 million, but LKAB stated that they believed it was possible to reduce the costs further.

In October 1992 the Swedish Ministry of Communications gave the final permission for LKAB to take over operations in their own right. On 26 October, SJ and NSB signed a new five-year contract with LKAB where the latter would purchase transport services from the two state railway. The annual price had then been reduced from SEK 650 to 400 million. Political commentators stated that the agreement allowed LKAB to keep all the profit in the line and introduce new cost savings, while SJ and NSB kept face by keeping the operating contract. The price reduction would mean that both NSB and SJ would have to lay off employees.

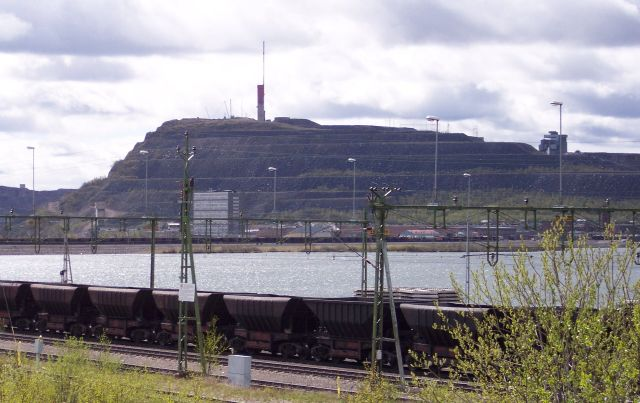
Hopper cars in Kiruna

In 1993, the state railways were losing money on the ore trains. In January 1994, SJ and NSB stated that they were going to merge the operations of the Iron Ore Line and the Ofoten Line. In May 1994, LKAB applied for traffic rights on the Ofoten Line. This was rejected in December 1994 by the Norwegian Ministry of Transport and Communications, who stated that the company did not meet the criteria in the law, including that the applicant had to have rail transport as their main activity. On 8 June 1995, LKAB established a Swedish and a Norwegian subsidiary dedicated to rail transport. This would bypass the rationale provided by the Ministry of Transport in denying them traffic rights, and LKAB stated that there was no way the Norwegian authorities now could deny them such rights, given EU Directive 91/440. At this time Norway was part of the European Economic Area (and Sweden of the EU) meaning EU directives were valid in both countries.

On 27 June 1995, LKAB, SJ and NSB reached an agreement where the three would establish a joint venture owned 51% by LKAB and 24.5% each by NSB and SJ. At the time there were 350 employees in the three companies involved in the transport, and the new company would recruit its employees among these, although it would need significantly fewer employees. The plans called for the new companies taking over operations from 1 January 1996. In late January, the committee concluded that LKAB met the criteria to receive traffic rights. The report also showed that 55 jobs would be lost in Narvik and that the Norwegian Railway Inspectorate had concerns regarding the safety of LKAB's operations.

The labor unions protested after LKAB demanded that the employees switch union from Swedish Union for Service and Communications Employees to the Swedish Metalworkers Union. This was rejected by the workers, who would both have to reduce their pay and work five more years before retirement. On 28 May, 22 train drivers, all Swedish, took out sick leave in protest towards being forced to switch labor union and receive lower wages and worse pension rights. This caused a third of the ore trains to be canceled. On 28 June, the transfer of operations was finalized following a vote in the Parliament of Norway.

=== Heavier trains ===
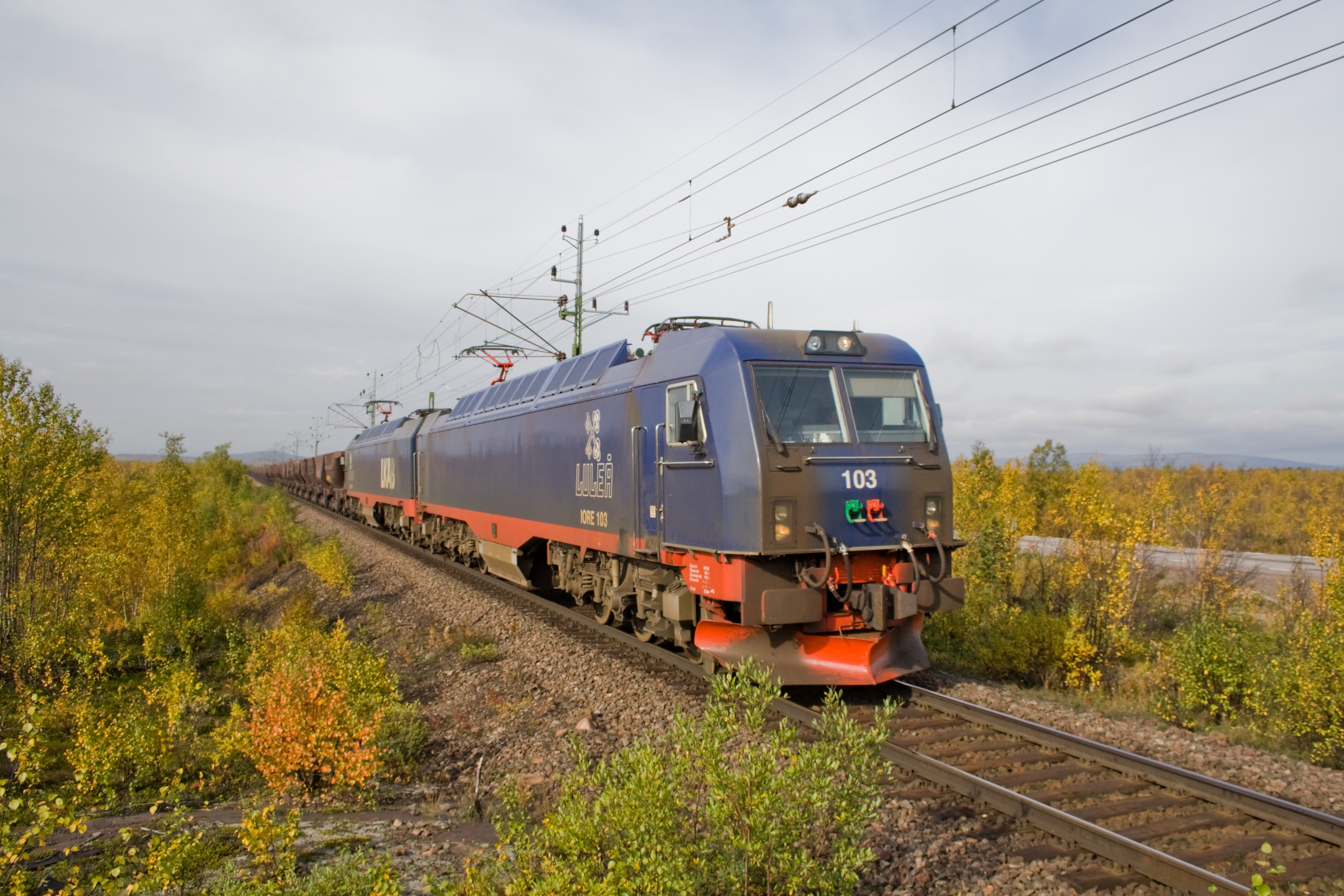
Iore locomotive near Kiruna

Malmtrafik took over operations from 1 July 1996. The company bought the Dm3-locomotives from SJ, NSB's six El 15 locomotives, and a number of workshops, depots and shunters. Post-nationalization, it became the first private railway company in Europe to haul international freight trains. from 26 September to 27 October 200 employees in Narvik were on strike regarding the transition rules for employees. While the strike lasted, there was increased shipments to Luleå. In November, the new ore port in Luleå opened, having cost LKAB more than half a billion Swedish kronor and a capacity of six million tonnes of ore per year.

In 1998, LKAB estimated a gradual 35% increase in production until 2005, and demanded that the track owners grant sufficient funding to upgrade the lines from 25-tonne (25-long-ton; 28-short-ton) to 30-tonne (30-long-ton; 33-short-ton) maximum permitted axle load. Combined with new locomotives, this would give increased efficiency in hauling the ore. The upgrade for the Ofoten Line would cost 180 million Norwegian krone, and would allow LKAB to increase the train weight from 4,100 to 8,600 tonnes (4,000 to 8,500 long tons; 4,500 to 9,500 short tons). In addition, heavier trains would have to be longer, so sufficient passing loops would have to be upgraded to 790 metres (2,590 ft).

In March, LKAB awarded the contract to build 750 new 100-tonne hopper cars to Transnet of South Africa, after among others Norsk Verkstedindustri had been considered. In August, an agreement was reached whereby LKAB would pay for NOK 100 million of the NOK 130 million needed to upgrade the Ofoten Line. The contract to deliver 18 Iore locomotives was signed with Bombardier on 15 September 1998. LKAB bought SJ and NSB's share of MTAB in 1999, making MTAB a subsidiary.

The first twin unit locomotive was delivered in 2000, and serial delivery was made from 2002 to 2004. In March 2004, LKAB decided to not purchase the option for additional hopper cars from Transnet, and instead purchase 750 heavier cars from K-Industrier. Since 1969 the ore trains have been using the Soviet SA3 coupler. However, LKAB wanted to try Janney couplers (also known as AAR coupler, used in much heavier trains in USA and South Africa), as the SA3 couplers were not much tested with the new weights. Later LKAB went back to SA3 couplers which now are used on all ore trains. In 2003, the Iron Ore Line from Kiruna to Riksgränsen and the Ofoten Line were finished upgraded to 30 tonne axle load, allowing half the trains to operate with maximum capacity.

The Northern East West Freight Corridor is an initiative by the International Union of Railways aiming to establish a freight corridor from the Far East to North America. The route would use the Ofoten Line and transship from rail to ship at Narvik. The main report for the project was made in 2004, but since there had been limited funding for the project.

On 23 August 2007, LKAB ordered another four twin units, with delivery in 2010 and 2011, and costing €52 million. This will replace all remaining Dm3. After delivery, six locomotives are used from Kiruna to Luleå, and twenty are used from Kiruna to Narvik. By 2009, sufficient passing loops had been built along the whole line from Narvik to Luleå to allow all trains to operate with full capacity. By 2011, LKAB's will be able to replace all the Dm3, and convert all the ore trains to 68 cars. This will increase the capacity from 28 to 33 million tonnes per year, and at the same time reduce the number of departures per day from 21 to 15.

A well managed ore train going downhill may have an electricity consumption of around zero due to regenerative braking.

=== Resignalling ===
In March 2021 it was announced that Hitachi Rail had been awarded a contract by Trafikverket to roll out ERTMS level 2 signalling system on the line between Gällivare and Boden. In September 2024, ERTMS was used for real traffic between Kiruna and Gällivare, the first ERTMS stretch on the Iron Ore Line.

=== Incidents ===
In December 2023 a fully laden train derailed near Vassijaure. The line was subsequently repaired and reopened in February 2024, however another derailment took place a week after it reopened near the same location. A preliminary investigation was opened to consider the possibility of sabotage.

== Equipment ==
=== Locomotives ===
To cope with the heavy ore transports this line was first equipped with the most powerful steam locomotives in Sweden and later powerful electric locomotives, the most famous being the Dm+Dm3+Dm that today are being replaced with modern Iore locomotives after serving on the line for over 40 years.

Locomotives
Name	Service	Power	Number
SJ Ma/Mb (steam)	1902–?		34
SJ R (steam)	1908–?	18 ton force	8
SJ O	1914–?		
NSB El 3	1925–1967	2x 2,134 kW	10
NSB El 4	1925–1963	2x 2,088 kW	5
SJ Dm3	1953–2013	3x 2,400 kW	97
NSB El 12	1954–1992	2x 2,398 kW	8
NSB El 15	1967–2004	2x 5,400 kW	6
SJ Rm	1977–1985 and 2013–	3x 3,600 kW	6
IORE	2000–	2x 5,400 kW	18

=== Other equipment ===
Apart from special locomotives, the iron ore trains have some special equipment to allow the high train weights, higher than anywhere else in Scandinavia, and probably anywhere in the European Union. They use special brakes and SA3 couplers instead of the screw couplings otherwise standard in Sweden. After extension of passing loops to 750 m in 2008 and 2009, the trains will have 68 cars, weighing 8600 tonnes including the locomotive, with 6800 tonnes of iron ore.

The railway also carries passenger services. Vy Tåg operates a daily overnight service from Narvik to Stockholm. This route is operated as a public service obligation and used to be operated by SJ but was transferred to Vy at the 2021 timetable. There are further regional services between Kiruna and Luleå under the Norrtåg concession, which have also been operated by Vy since 2016, at which time they used the name (Svenska) Tågkompaniet as a sub-brand for their Swedish operations.

Driver Advisory System are installed on board to improve eco-friendliness of driving.

A new snow blower entered service in 2016.

== See also ==
- Swedish iron ore during World War II
- Kirkenes–Bjørnevatn Line
