= ERESS =

European Partnership for Railway Energy Settlement Systems

The European Partnership for Railway Energy Settlement Systems (ERESS) is a partnership of European infrastructure managers that develops, offers and supplies energy settlement system and energy calculation systems for trains.

The ERESS railway energy settlement system, Erex, provides energy metering services and enables the industry to measure, control and bill for the actual energy consumed by trains. At any given time there will be numerous trains active on the railway network. Trains consume electricity from the grid, for which they need to pay according to their use. The national authority, represented by an infrastructure manager, is responsible for billing this use. The infrastructure manager sends an energy bill to the train companies. In Europe before ERESS, most infrastructure managers used estimates to bill train energy consumption.

The idea of ERESS was presented for the first time in 1999 by the director of Jernbaneverket Bane Energi (part of Norwegian National Rail Administration) Johnny Brevik in a Scandinavian Railway Conference in Tampere Finland. It was a brand new idea, therefore it took 4 years before the first agreement between Jernbaneverket, Banverket and Banedanmark was signed in 2004. Johnny Brevik was the first leader of the Board of Directors (2004-2009).

It was founded in 2004 under the name Nress (Nordic Railway Energy Settlement System), and was a collaboration between Trafikkverket (former Banverket), Banedanmark and Bane NOR (Former Jernbaneverket). In 2008 the name was changed to ERESS (European Railway Energy Settlement System). Although the administrative headquarter is in Oslo, Norway, the ERESS Board of Directors consists of representatives from each of the 7 existing partners. The program has been shown to result in energy savings and was awarded an award for Energy and CO_{2} at the 2012 International Union of Railways Sustainability Conference.

== Erex ==
The energy settlement system provided by ERESS is called Erex. This, according to Railway Pro (2011), enables infrastructure managers to fulfill requirements for a neutral and non-discriminatory operation, and railway undertakings to understand their use of energy and thereby save energy and costs. The system is composed of the following elements: Advanced energy meters mounted on board trains, an energy measurement system that collects and validates the metered data and a settlement system that performs the settlement, cost distribution, data exchange and billing. According to that article, Erex is unique on the European market in the way that it's the only system that can provide such advanced services to railways.

As of 2017, the system is being tested by the French National Railways (SNCF): "French National Railways (SNCF) is to test the Erex IT energy management and billing system on 50 of its freight locomotives developed by the Eress consortium of five European infrastructure managers and one railway."

== Energy savings ==
In the Railway Journal on June 16, 2016, Mr. Dyre Martin Gulbrandsen reports that the added accuracy in invoicing by the ERESS system creates an incentive to save energy. By billing the actual energy used the train companies start adhere to a more economic driving pattern.

=== Documented energy savings ===
At least two studies of the Norwegian National Railways (NSB) have documented energy savings resulting from the adoption of ERESS. One study found an 18% energy efficiency improvement for NSB between 2004 and 2009. Another from 2016 noted that NSB saved €37m in energy consumption costs since installing Erex in 2004, and that the rail system is using approximately 75% of the energy it was consuming 12 years ago.

== Awards ==
During the 10th International Union of Railways Sustainability Conference in 2012 in Venice, ERESS was awarded an Energy and CO_{2} award.

== Partners ==
As of February 2024, ERESS partners are: (Initiated by Bane NOR (former Jernbaneverket), Banedanmark and Trafikverket. Others in joining order):

1. Bane NOR (Norwegian Railway Infrastructure Manager)
2. Banedanmark (Danish Railway Infrastructure Manager)
3. Trafikverket (Swedish Transport Administration)
4. Infrabel NV (Belgian Railway Infrastructure Manager)
5. Liikennevirasto (Finnish Transport Agency)
6. SBB AG (Swiss National Railway Company)
7. Vivens (Dutch railway energy procurement cooperative)
8. Administrador de Infraestructuras Ferroviarias (Spanish Railway Infrastructure Manager)
9. Société Nationale des Chemins de Fer Luxembourgeois (Luxembourg National Railway Company)
10. Infraestruturas de Portugal (Portuguese Railway Infrastructure Manager)

The ERESS Board of Directors consists of representatives from national railway and infrastructure bodies of each of these seven partner countries.
