= SJ Tc =

Swedish diesel locomotive class

Tc
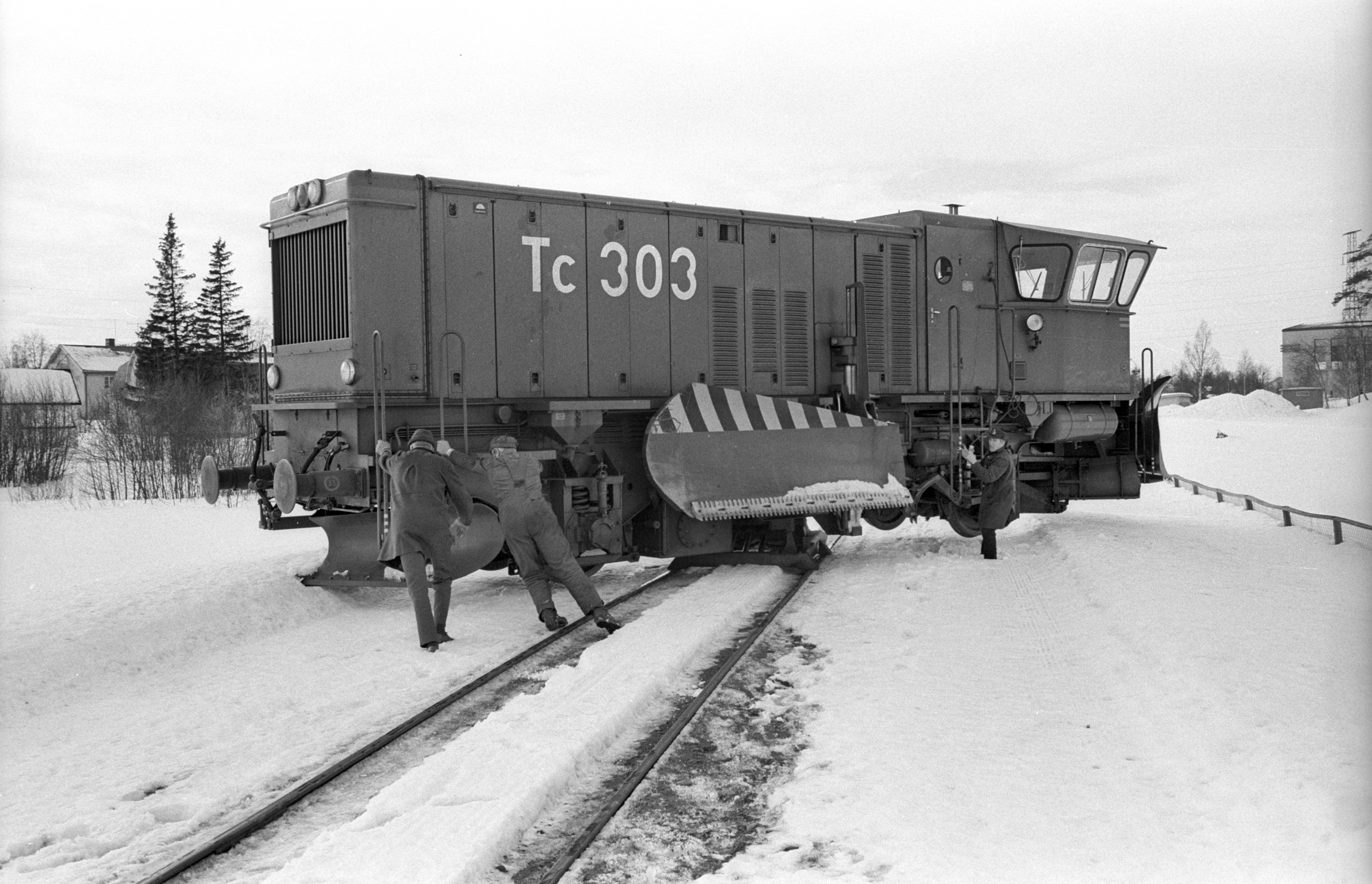
- SJ Tc 303 being turned around after clearing snow in Skellefteå
Type and origin
- Power type: Diesel-hydraulic
- Builder: NOHAB
- Build date: 1969-1971
- Total produced: 20
Specifications
- Configuration
  - Whyte: 4wDH
  - AAR: B
  - UIC: B
- Gauge: 1,435 mm (4 ft 8 1/2 in)
- Length: 12,370 mm (40 ft 7 in) normal, 13,900 mm (45 ft 7 in) snowploughs extended
- Loco weight: 33.4 t (32.9 long tons; 36.8 short tons) tare weight
- Transmission: Hydraulic
- MU working: Within Class
Performance figures
- Maximum speed: 90 km/h (56 mph)
- Power output: 450 kW (600 hp)
Career
- Operators: Infranord and Strukton Rail AB
- Numbers: 294-313

SJ Tc is a diesel-hydraulic locomotive used in Sweden for line service and snowploughing. Twenty locomotives were built for Swedish State Railways (Swedish: Statens Järnvägar, SJ) in 1969-1971 by Nydquist & Holm for combined freight, line service and snowploughing service, alongside 10 of the larger Tb diesel-electric locomotives. SJ used the locomotives for freight and track work trains during the summer and for snow removal in the winter. In 1984, the locomotives were transferred to the service fleet and they were then mainly used for track work trains.

When the Swedish Rail Administration (Banverket) was created as a demerger from the Swedish State Railways in 1988, all Tc locomotives were transferred to the latter. Since the early-2000s, many units have been taken out of service. As of 2017, only three Tc locomotives remain in operation, two operated by Strukton Rail AB and one operated by Infranord.

They are fitted with a lifting plate in between the driving axles which allows the locomotive to lift itself off the tracks and so be turned around. This feature allows the cab and snowploughs to always face forward. The large snowploughs can also be removed when they are not required for a particular occasion.

Power for the Tc is provided by a 600 hp (450 kW) diesel prime mover which is manufactured by German engine builder Deutz. This prime mover is attached to a hydraulic transmission which drives the locomotives four driving wheels. The Tc is capable of speeds up to 90 km/h (56 mph).

The Tc is controlled by a single operator from a control cab mounted on one end of the locomotive. The cab features large windows to provide good visibility to the front and sides which assist in safely operating the locomotive. Alongside this, a Tc locomotives is capable of working in conjunction with another Tc locomotive via a multiple unit arrangement.

== Gallery ==
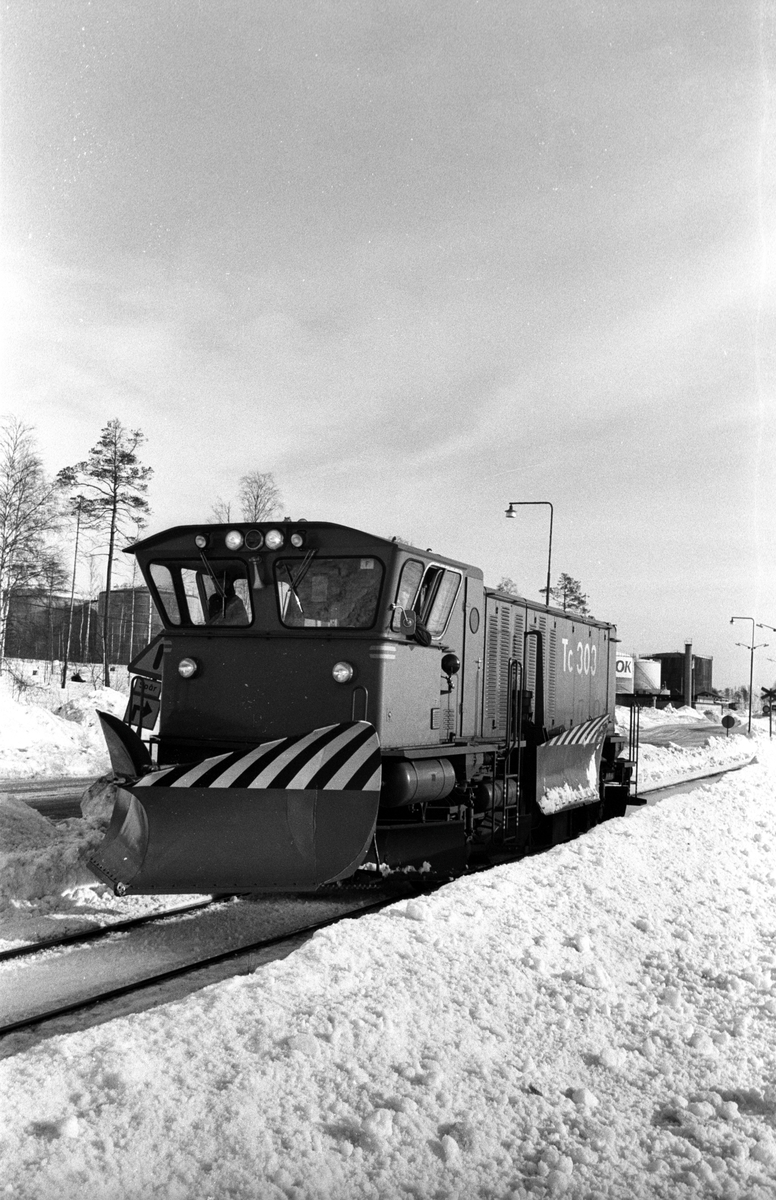

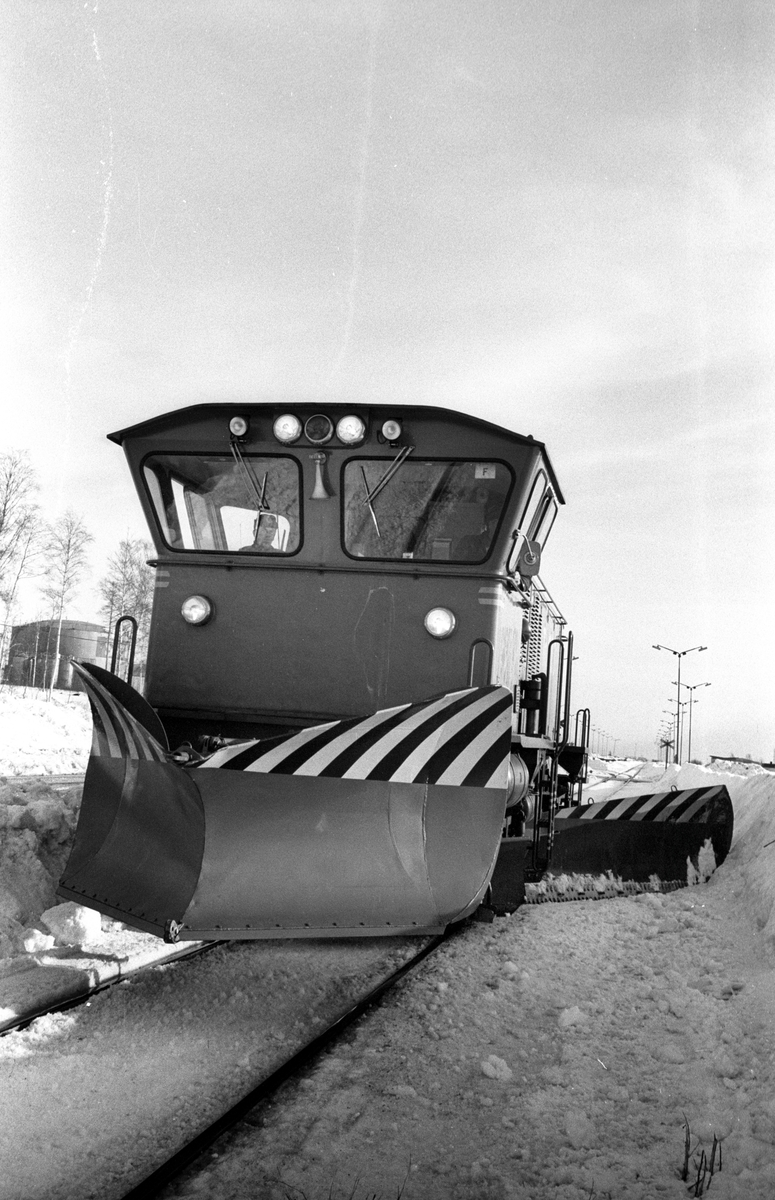
SJ Tc 303 during snowploughing operations near Skellefteå

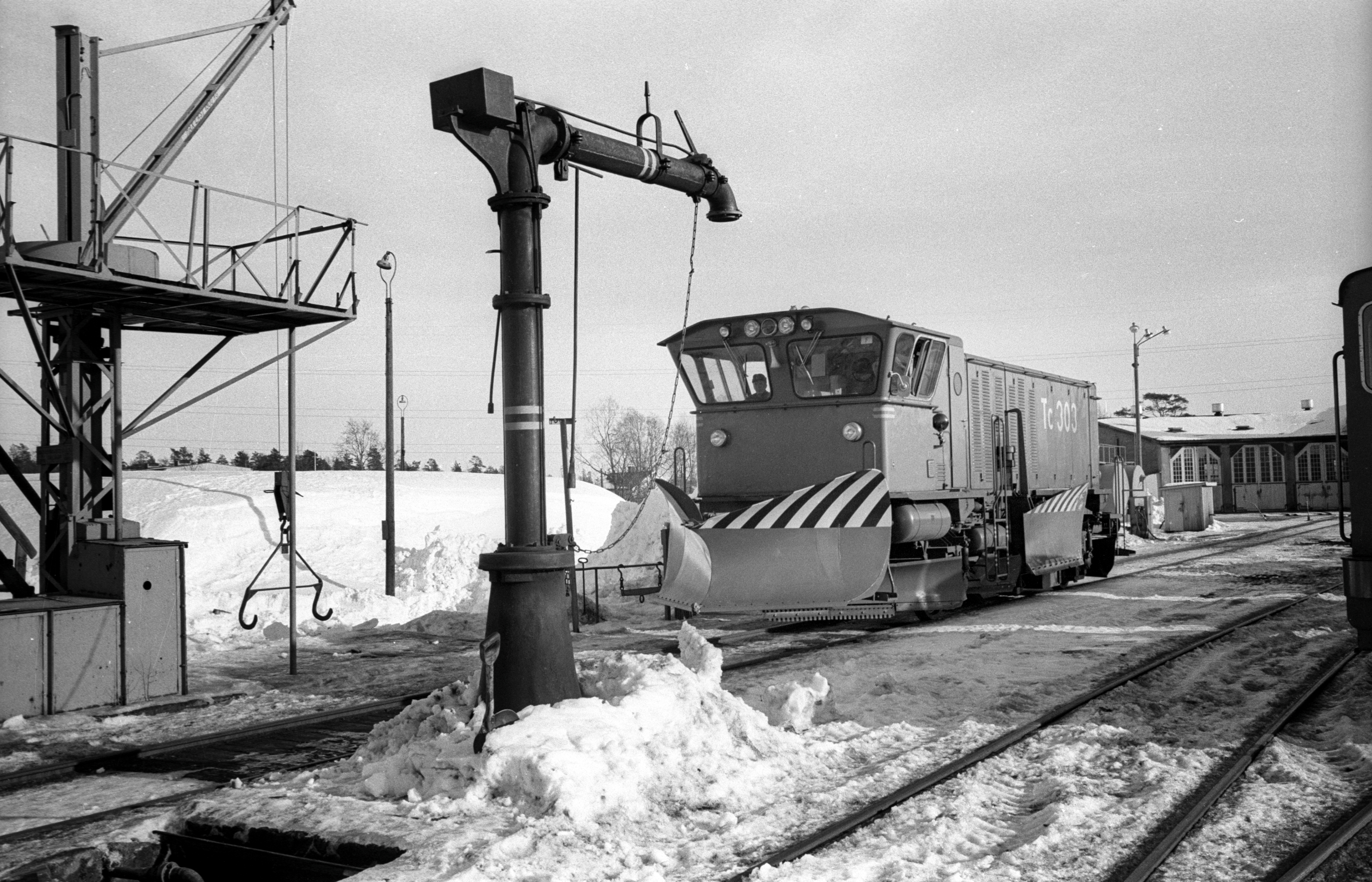

== See also ==
- SJ Tb - a similar and larger Swedish locomotive
