= SJ Tb =

Swedish diesel locomotive class

Tb
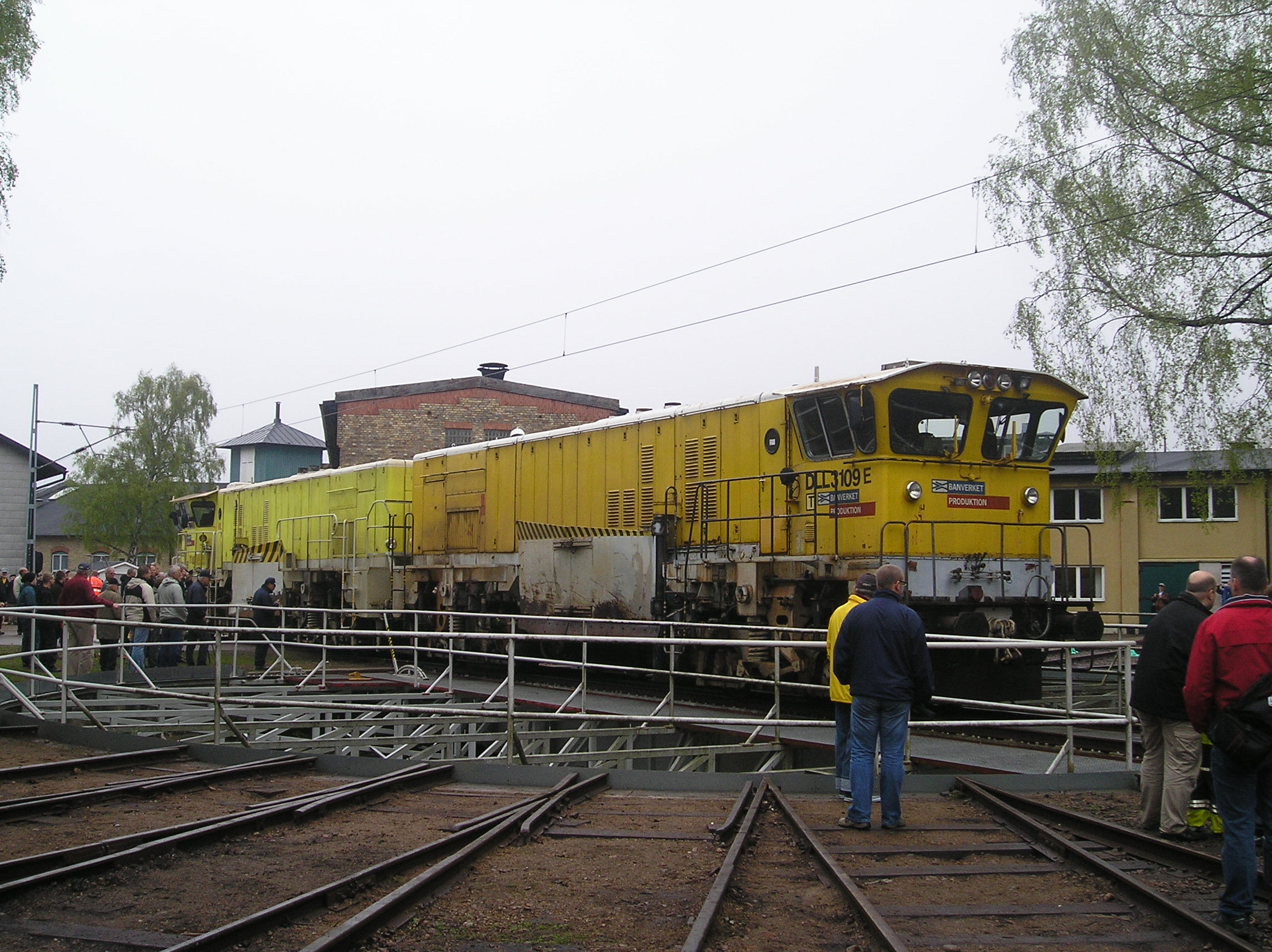
- Banverket DLL3109 in Ängelholm
Type and origin
- Power type: Diesel-electric
- Builder: NOHAB
- Build date: 1969-1970
- Total produced: 10
Specifications
- Configuration
  - UIC: Bo′Bo′
- Gauge: 1,435 mm (4 ft 8 1/2 in)
- Length: 16,600 mm (54 ft 5 1/2 in)
- Loco weight: 84 t (82.7 long tons; 92.6 short tons) tare weight
- Transmission: Electric
Performance figures
- Maximum speed: 105 km/h (65 mph)
- Power output: 1,235 kW (1,656 hp)
Career
- Operators: Banverket
- Numbers: 284-293

Tb is a diesel-electric locomotive used by Banverket of Sweden, for line service and snowploughing. Ten locomotives were built for Swedish State Railways (Swedish: Statens Järnvägar, SJ) in 1969-1970 by Nydquist & Holm (NOHAB), for combined freight and snowploughing service, along with 20 smaller Tc locomotives. When Banverket was demerged in 1988, the Tb was transferred to it.
