= Ulvin Tunnel =

Railway tunnel in Eidsvoll, Norway

- Interactive map of Ulvin Tunnel

Overview
- Line: Dovre Line
- Location: Morskogen, Eidsvoll, Norway
- Coordinates: 60.4730°N 11.2424°E
- Status: In use

Operation
- Opened: 1 December 2015
- Owner: Norwegian National Rail Administration

Technical
- Line length: 3,985 m (13,074 ft)
- No. of tracks: Double
- Track gauge: 1,435 mm (4 ft 8 1/2 in)
- Electrified: 15 kV 16.7 Hz AC
- Operating speed: 200 km/h (120 mph)

The Ulvin Tunnel (Norwegian: Ulvintunnelen) is a 3,985-meter (13,074 ft) railway tunnel running through Morskogen and Ulvin in Eidsvoll, Norway. The single-tube tunnel carried double track of the Dovre Line, allowing it to bypass the village of Morskogen. Construction was part of a 17-kilometer (11 mi) new double track between Langset and Kleverud. This was built jointly with the new European Road E6 four-lane motorway. The Ulvin Tunnel will allow for higher speeds and more traffic on the Dovre Line.

The Ulvin Tunnel runs in the same area as the Morskogen Tunnel of said motorway. The route was controversial due to it hugging the shoreline of the lake Mjøsa. Local and environmental authorities wanted most of the railway and motorway to run in tunnels. It resulted in a compromise, where the Ulvin Tunnel allowed for a longer section of lakeshore to remain untouched. The groundwork contract was awarded to Veidekke and Hochtief, along with other works. The permanent way was laid by Infranord; Eltel installed the electrical and telecommunications systems. The tunnel opened on 1 December 2015.

== Specifications ==
The Ulvin Tunnel is 3,985-meter (13,074 ft) long and runs roughly north–south through the Ulvin area in Eidsvoll. It is built with a curve, allowing the Dovre Line to bypass the village of Morskogen. The single-tube tunnel is dimensioned for a speed of 200 kilometers per hour (120 mph) and is electrified at 15 kV 16.7 Hz AC. The Ulvin tunnel passes under part of the Morskogen Tunnel, a twin-tubed tunnel which carries the E6.

== History ==
The original railway line along the shore of Mjøsa opened as part of the segment from Eidsvoll to Hamar on 8 November 1880. The single track segment received electric traction on 15 June 1953, centralized traffic control on 22 March 1965 and automatic train stop on 1 November 1983. The Ulvin area received a station, at first named Ulvin and later Morskogen. It featured a passing loop and served as a stop until 1 June 1980. The entire line from Eidsvoll to Hamar originally ran entirely without tunnels.

The single track and curvature limit both the capacity and the speed of trains. Between Eidsvoll Station and Hamar Station there is no additional capacity for additional trains. Due to the limitations in horizontal curvature, the section of line is predominantly limited to speeds under 100 kilometers per hour (62 mph). The North Corridor provides poor reliability and punctuality, especially for regional, long-distance and freight trains, which are only on time about seventy percent of the time. Two-thirds of the delays are caused by the infrastructure, in part due to exceeding the line's capacity, in part due to technical faults, especially the signaling and power systems.

As part of the InterCity Triangle upgrades, this section has been identified as a priority. A new double track from Eidsvoll to Hamar will allow for a doubling of the number of trains, improved reliability and a reduction of the travel time from Hamar to Oslo to one hour. This required an all-new double-track line to be built from Oslo to Hamar. The first part, the 64-kilometer (40 mi) Gardermoen Line, opened on 27 September 1998.

Meanwhile, there was planning of a new four-lane motorway to be built to replace the E6 from Gardermoen to Kolomoen. The go-ahead for this project was approved by the government in 2006. Due to the proximity of the motorway and railway routes, the Norwegian Public Roads Administration teamed up with the National Rail Administration to establish common plans and construction for the project.

The 24-kilometer (15 mi) section from Minnesund in Eidsvoll to Skaberud in Stange was the most controversial. There were two general alternatives – building the road and railway along the lakeshore of Mjøsa, or building major portions of the infrastructure in tunnels. In addition it was possible to elect an intermediate route which would build tunnels along some of the most critical places. The infrastructure authorities initially proposed a route with no major tunnels, in order to save NOK 500 million. The two most contended locations were at Ørbeck/Korslund and Morskogen/Ulvin. In the latter the Public Roads Administration recommended a 30-meter (98 ft) culvert. Several institutions opposed this view, with among others both municipalities, the Directorate for Nature Management. They cited the value of the lakeshore areas and were concerned that building the railway and motorways right on the shore would have a decremental effect on the recreational opportunities in the area.

The disagreement at first resulted in negotiations between various public agencies. Due to the county border running through the right-of-way, involved parties included Eidsvoll and Stange Municipalities, Akershus and Hedmark County Municipalities, and the County Governors of Oslo/Akershus and Hedmark. In the end the County Governors asked the Ministry of the Environment to decide on the issue. The route was finalized in a joint announcement from the Ministry of Transport and Communications, and the Ministry of the Environment on 24 February 2009. Minister of Transport, Liv Signe Navarsete, described the choice as a compromise. Most of the route was placed along the lakeshore, while the most valuable sections, at Morskogen and Ulvin, were protected by placing the railway and motorway through tunnels.

The E6–Dovre Line Joint Project was formalized as a joint venture between the Public Roads Administration and the National Rail Administration on 6 July 2010. Through the joint effort the two agencies estimated that the project would save about NOK 400 million by awarding common contracts to build both the railway and the motorway. One contributing cause was that earthwork removed during the road construction could be used to fill in for the railway tracks. For the railway the Joint Project was responsible for building a 17-kilometer (11 mi) section from Langset to Kleverud.

Railway tunnels built in Norway during the 1990s and 2000s had been plagued with leaks. These can stop all traffic is the water drips on technical installations, causing short circuiting. To avoid such issues, the National Rail Administration chose to instead build the tunnel with concrete lining. This involved that the tunnel was built with a waterproof plastic membrane on the inside of the concrete. The administration estimates this increases the tunnel's lifetime from 50 to 100 years. This alternative was used in both the Ulvin Tunnel and the two other tunnels in the project. It received criticism from some researchers, who stated that a membrane was unnecessarily expensive, that it is near impossible to repair any breaches which might occur and that use of foreign technology could weaken Norway's international reputation in tunneling.

The Ulvin Tunnel was built as part of FP2, from Brøhaug to Strandlykkja. The Joint Project asked for common bids to build both the railway and the motorway on the section. FP2 was won by a joint venture between Veidekke and Hochtief. The contract, including the blasting of the tunnel, cost NOK 1.6 billion. They blasted all but the last 20 meters (66 ft) of the southern portal, which was blasted by Hæhre Entreprenør.

Preliminary work on the tunnel started in March 2011. The first blasting took place on 2 September 2011, when work on the tunnel's crosscut started. The National Rail Administration offered a service to residents in the area where they could receive a Short Message Service message every time blasting was to be carried out. Construction of the road segment commenced on 12 April 2012. Combined the projects cost NOK 10.1 billion. One of the major contractors, Alpine Bau, filed for bankruptcy in June 2013, causing considerable delays in the project. However, this had little effect on the works on the Ulvin Tunnel.

Each tunneling shift counted 33 people, working around the clock in three eight-hour shifts. Work progressed using a 12-meter (39 ft) mold. One such a section was completed, the work advanced a further 12 meters (39 ft). This process was repeated 333 times. Blasting had to take place at regular intervals, when there were no trains running on the railway line nearby. Access was limited, among other things because of the tracks running past and the steep terrain. The work involved blasting 500,000 cubic meters (18,000,000 cu ft) of earthwork, transported away in 25,000 truckloads. The membrane covers and area of 95,000 square meters (1,020,000 sq ft), while the lining required 80,000 cubic meters (2,800,000 cu ft) of concrete. Most of the earthwork was ditched in Mjøsa, at depths of up to 28 meters (92 ft). This gave reclaimed land which could be used to build the right-of-way for the railway. A fatal accident took place in May 2013, when a truck backed over a worker in the tunnel. Surveys carried out by the Norwegian Institute for Water Research showed that Mjøsa had not been polluted by the construction, nor that the plankton or organisms had been adversely effected.

The contract for the permanent way, including ballast, track and the overhead wires was issued to Infranord and was worth NOK 163.9 million. The contract for the signaling, telecommunications and power supply was issued to Eltel and was worth NOK 146.2 million. The latter included lighting, ventilation and other technical components in the tunnels. Both contracts were for the entire 17-kilometer (11 mi) section. Infranord used a SVM 1000 track-laying train in November 2014 to lay the permanent way. The 200-meter (660 ft) long train was able to lay about 1,000 meters (3,300 ft) of ballast, ties and track each day.
