= SKG =

SKG, Skg or skg may mean:

== Transport ==
- SKG, IATA code for Thessaloniki Airport, Greece
- SKG, Indian Railways station code for Saktigarh railway station, West Bengal, India
- SKG, MRT station abbreviation for Sengkang MRT/LRT station, Singapore
- SKG, National Rail station code for Skegness railway station, East Lindsey, England
- Skg, station code for Skogås railway station, Sweden

== Other ==
- DreamWorks SKG, original name of the company (for founders Spielberg, Katzenberg, and Geffen)
- skg, ISO 639-3 code for Sakalava language
- Stop Killing Games, a consumer movement launched in 2024 for preserving online-only video games
- SKG Alliance, a defunct political party in Latvia
