= Trångsund railway station =

Railway station in Trångsund, Sweden

Trångsund
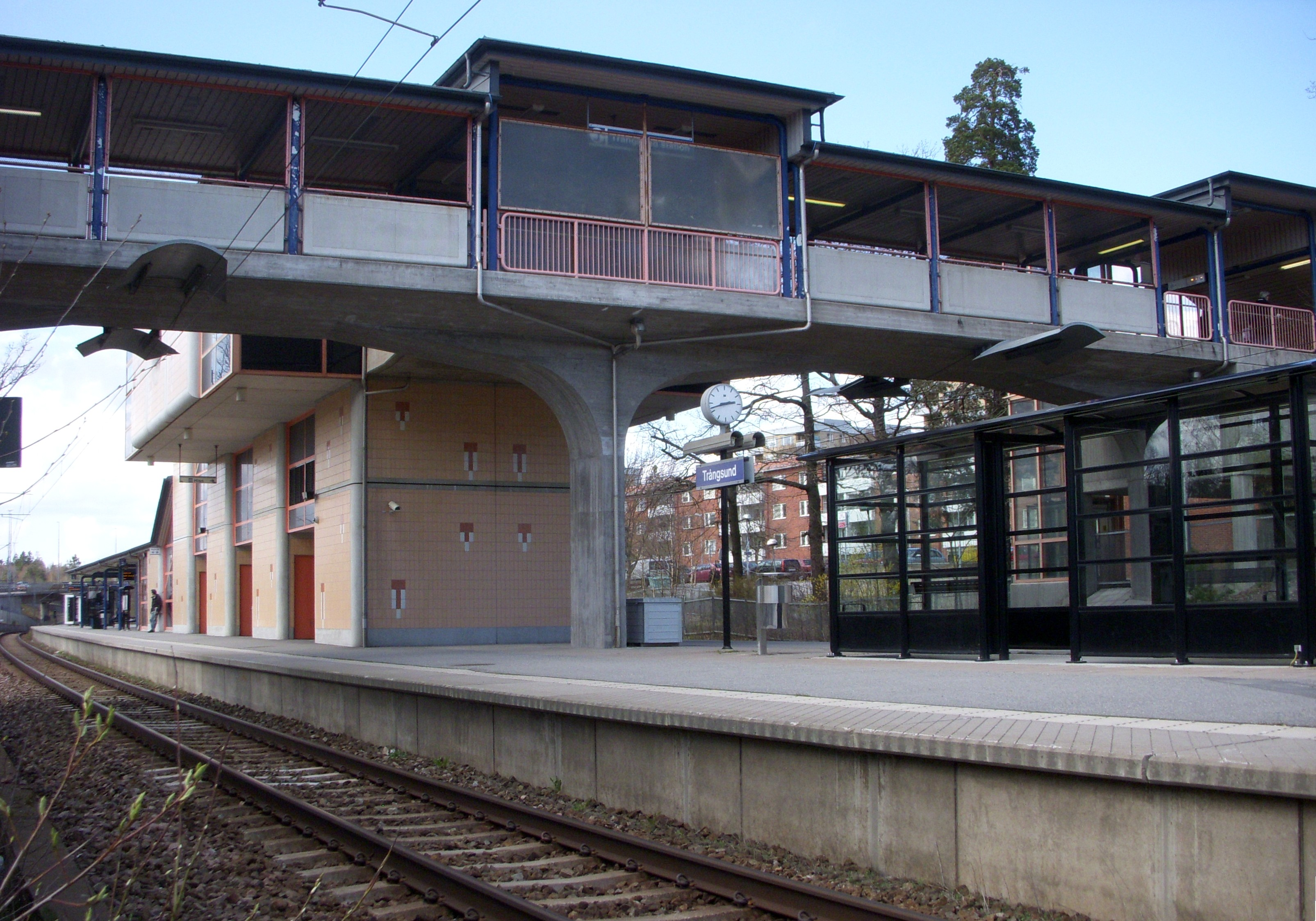
- Trångsund station in 2012

General information
- Location: Trångsund, Huddinge Municipality, Stockholm County
- Coordinates: 59°13′40″N 18°7′50″E
- System: Pendeltåg
- Owner: Swedish Transport Administration
- Platforms: 1 Island Platform
- Tracks: 2

Construction
- Structure type: At-grade

Other information
- Station code: Tåd

History
- Opened: 1901 (original), 1995 (current)
- Rebuilt: 1995

Passengers
- 2015: 2,200 boarding per weekday (2015) (commuter rail)

Services
| Preceding station | Stockholm commuter rail | Following station |
|---|---|---|
| Farsta strand towards Bålsta | 43 | Skogås towards Nynäshamn |
Location

Trångsund is a station on Stockholm's commuter rail network, located 18.1 km from Stockholm Central Station on the Nynäs Line in the Huddinge Municipality district of Trångsund. The station features a central island platform and a ticket hall. As of 2015, the station had approximately 2,200 boardings per weekday.

== History ==
A stop was first opened here by the Stockholm-Nynäs Railway in 1901. After the Stockholm Regional Transport Authority (SL) took over local rail traffic and integrated it into the commuter rail system, a simple ticket booth was placed on the platform in 1973. A modern station facility was built in 1986 but was demolished a few years later to make way for double-tracking work. The current station was opened in August 1995.

== Gallery ==
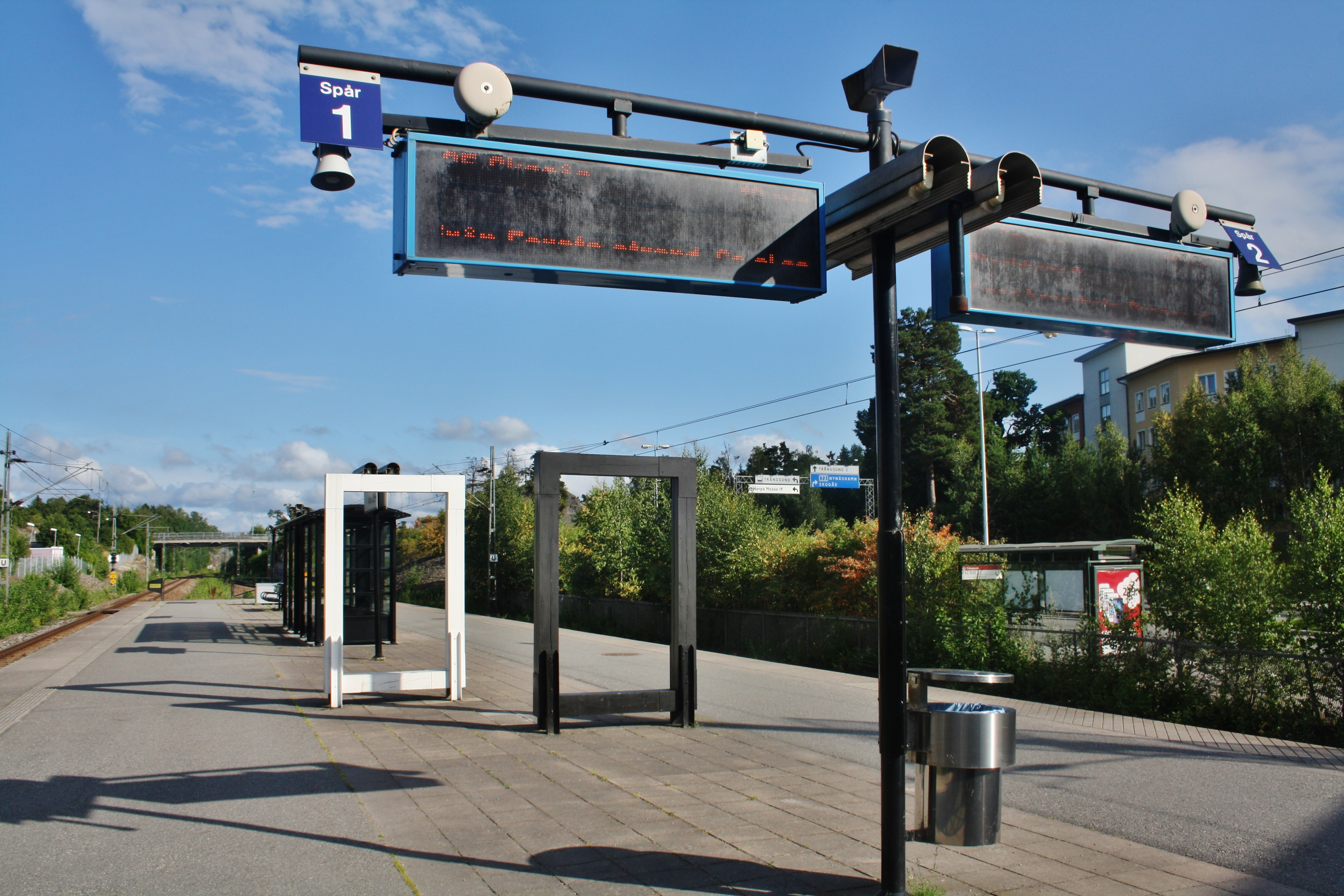
Platform

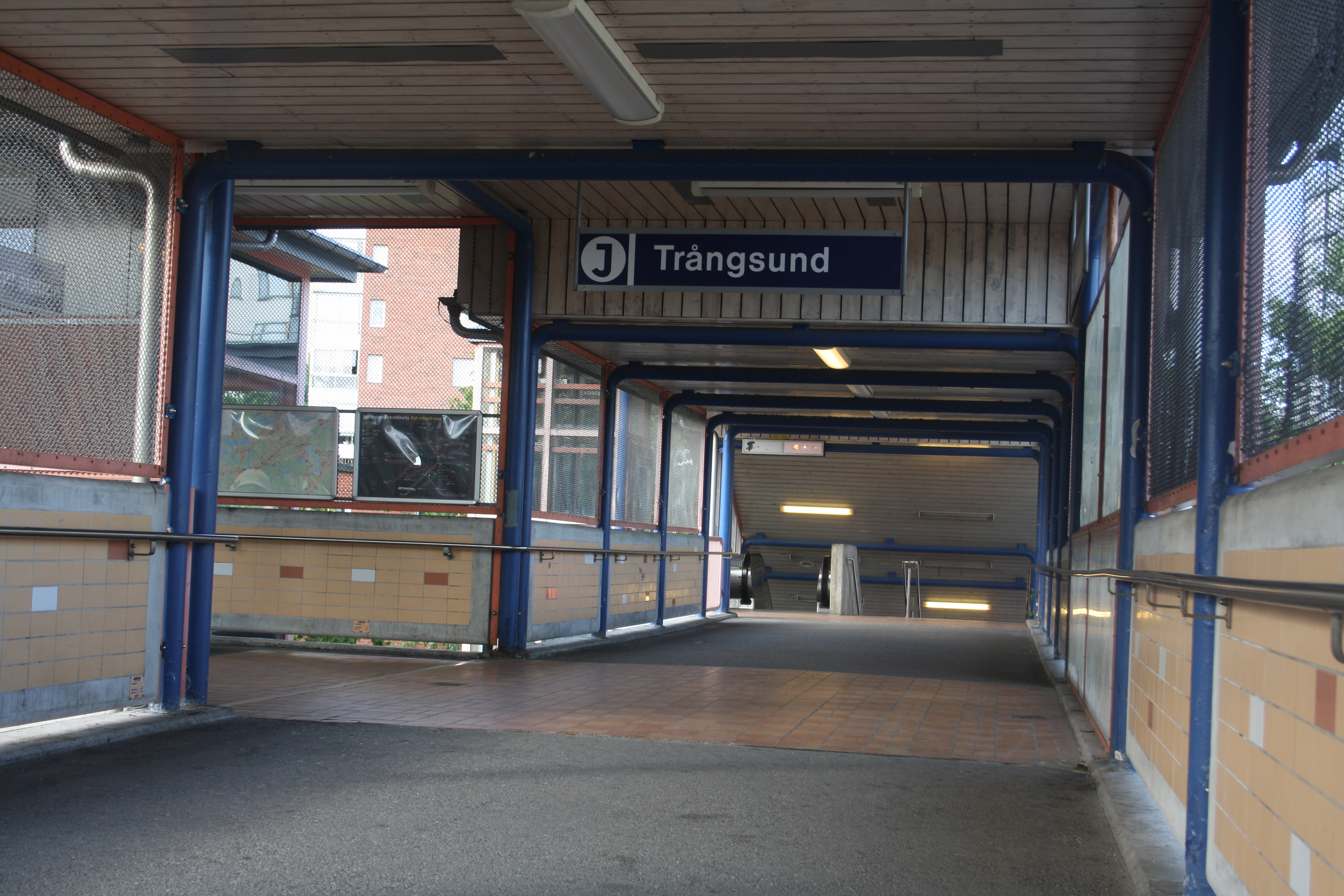
Tunnel to the platform

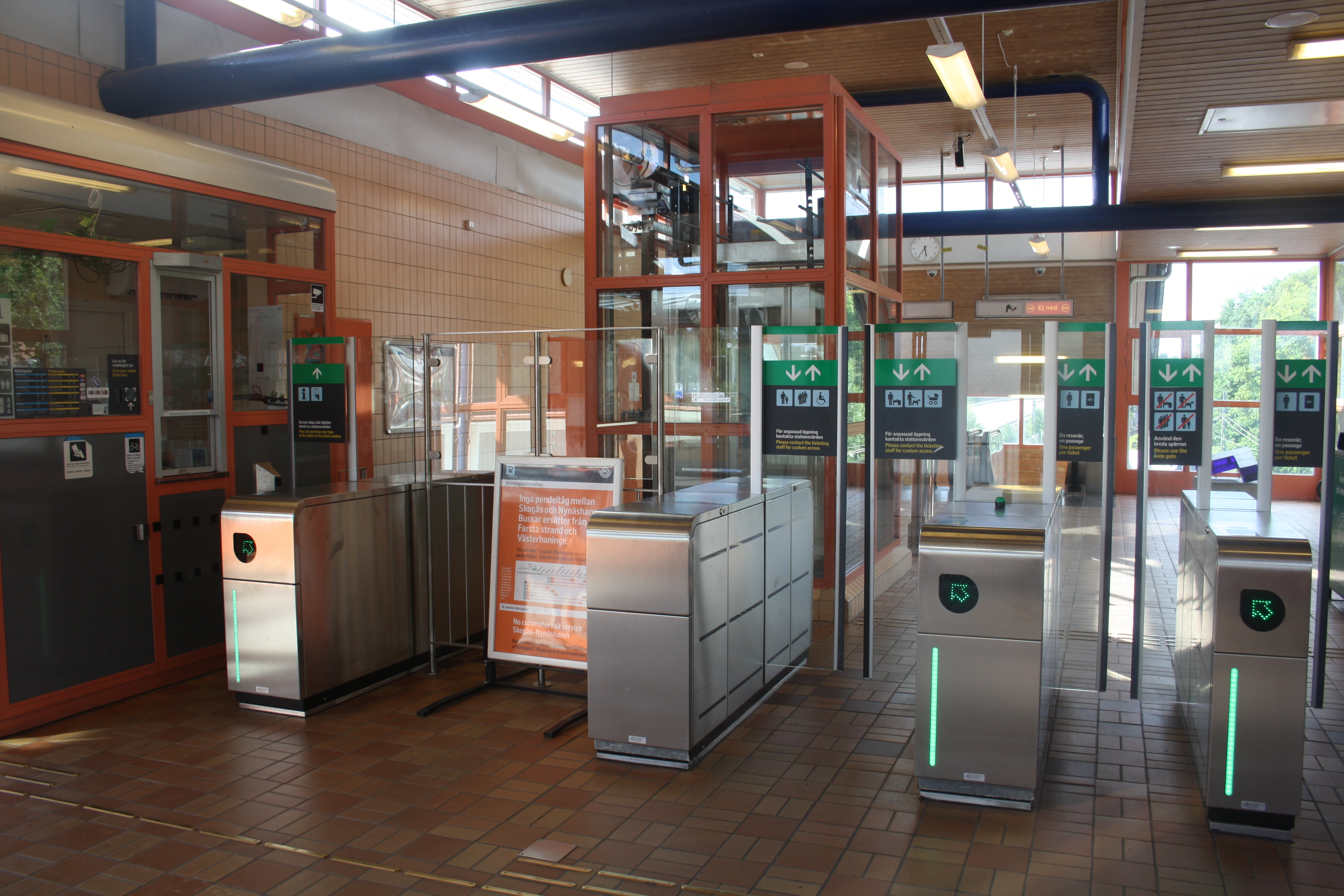
Ticket barriers

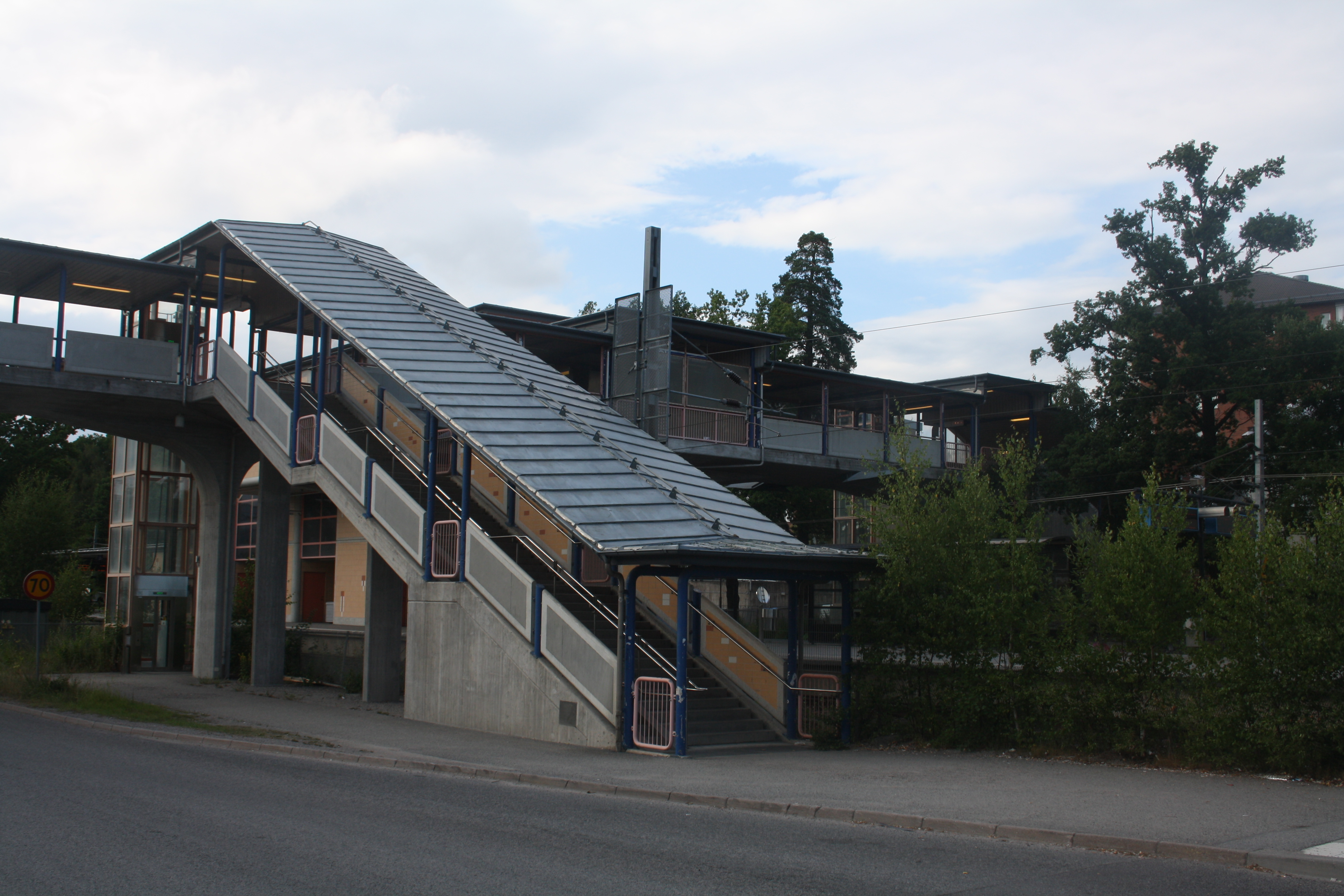
Station entrance

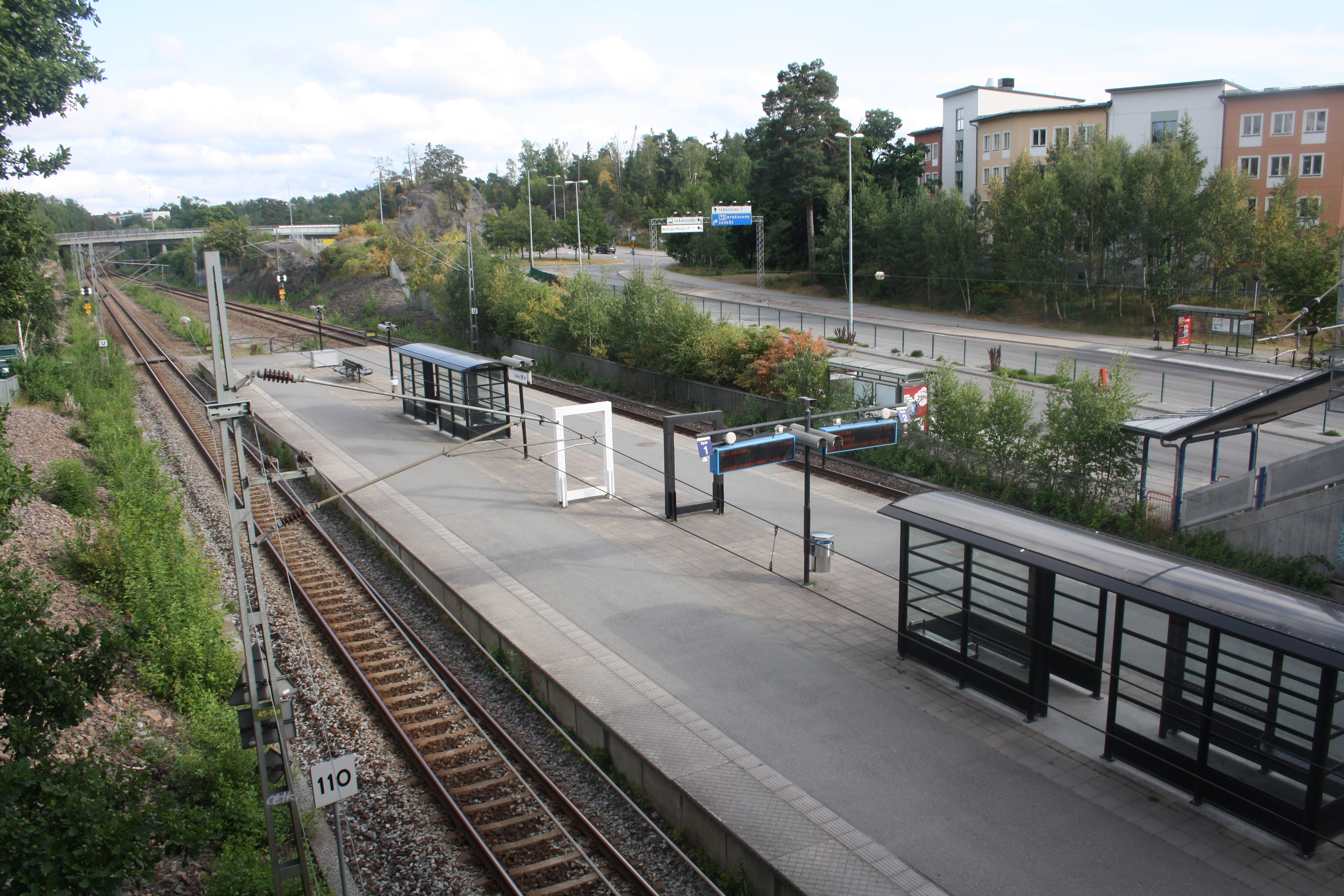
Aerial view of the platform
