= Swedish Road Administration =

Swedish government agency

Vägverket
- Type: Government agency
- Founded: 1 April 1983
- Defunct: 31 March 2010
- Successor: Swedish Transport Administration
- Headquarters: Borlänge, Sweden
- Area served: Sweden

The National Road Administration (Swedish: Vägverket) was a government agency in Sweden. Its primary responsibility was to organise building and maintenance of the road network in Sweden. Its headquarters were located in Borlänge.

== History ==
The agency was founded in 1841 as the Royal Board for Public Road and Water Structures (Swedish: Kongliga styrelsen för allmänna wäg- och wattenbyggnader) and was responsible for Sweden's canals and roads. In 1967, the agency changed its name to the National Swedish Road Administration (Swedish: Statens vägverk) and in 1983 to the National Road Administration (Swedish: Vägverket).

In 1993 the National Swedish Road Safety Office (Trafiksäkerhetsverket) was merged into the agency.

In 2009 the responsibility for the vehicle register and issuing of drivers' licenses, was moved to a new authority, the Swedish Transport Agency. At the same time the department for the actual road work was separated from the National Road Administration into a government owned company, called Svevia. For a number of year this department, then called Vägverket Produktion, was a profit-making organisation competing with private companies.

The agency was merged with the Swedish National Rail Administration on 1 April 2010 to create the new Swedish Transport Administration.
