= Skogås railway station =

Railway station in Huddinge, Sweden

Skogås
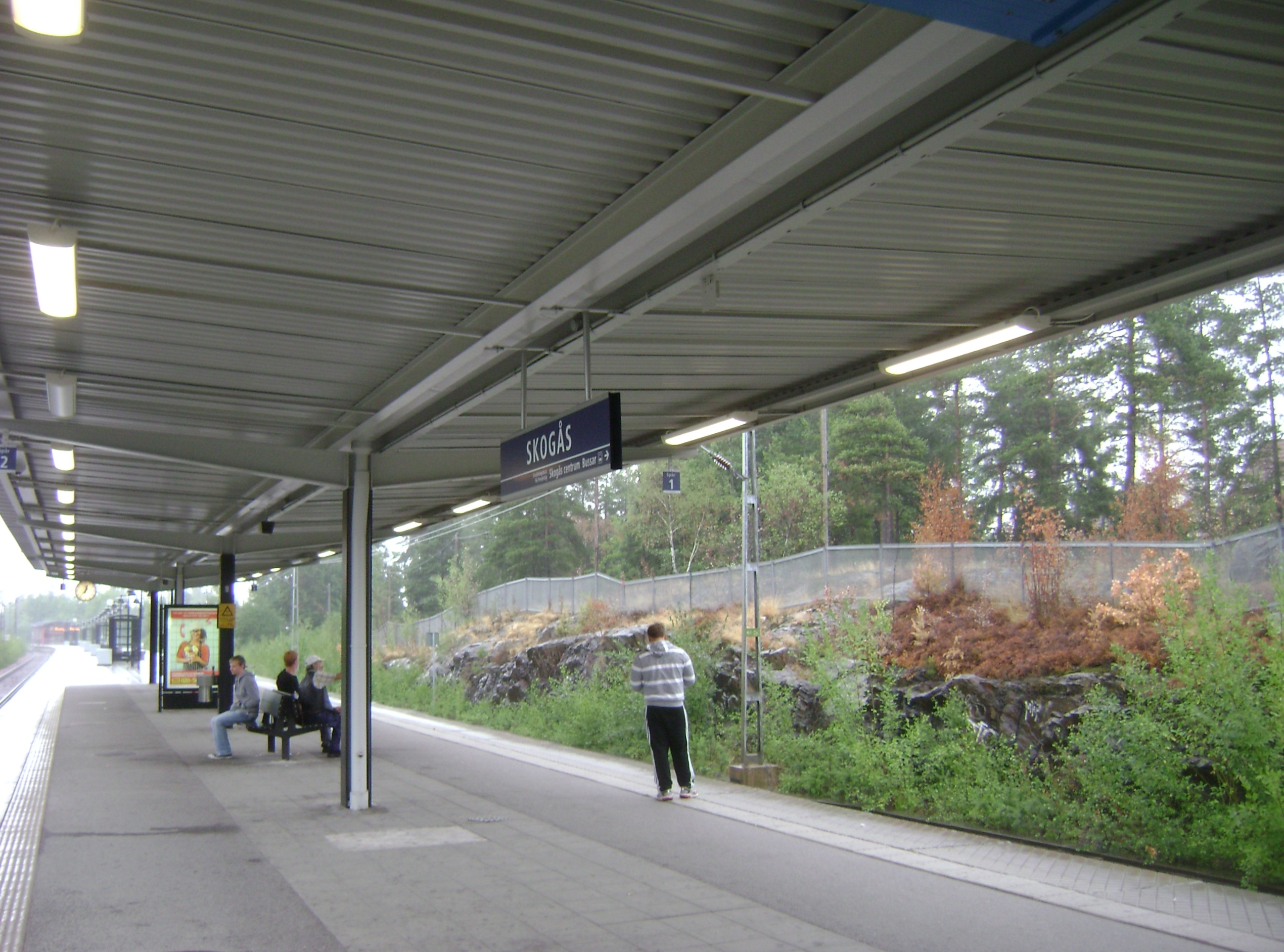
- Skogås station

General information
- Location: Sweden
- Coordinates: 59.2194°N 18.1534°E
- System: Pendeltåg
- Owner: Swedish Transport Administration
- Line: Nynäs Line
- Platforms: 1 Island Platform
- Tracks: 2

Construction
- Structure type: At-grade

Other information
- Station code: Skg

History
- Opened: 1932 (as a stop), 1972 (as a station)
- Rebuilt: 1967 (relocation)

Passengers
- 2015: 4,400 boarding per weekday (2015) (commuter rail)

Services
Preceding station	Stockholm commuter rail	Following station
Trångsund towards Bålsta	43	Vega towards Nynäshamn
Location

Skogås is a station on the Stockholm commuter rail network, located in the district of Skogås within Huddinge Municipality on the Nynäs Line, 19.9 km from Stockholm Central Station. The station features a central platform with two ticket halls. As of 2015, Skogås had approximately 4,400 boarding passengers per day.

== History ==
A small stop was opened at this location by Stockholm-Nynäs Railway Company in 1932. The station was relocated 400 meters north in 1967, rebuilt, and upgraded to a full station in 1972. For a long time, Skogås had only an entrance at its southern end, with an unofficial "shortcut" in the northern section. During the expansion to double track operations, an official entrance with ticket barriers was added at the northern end of the platform.

== Gallery ==
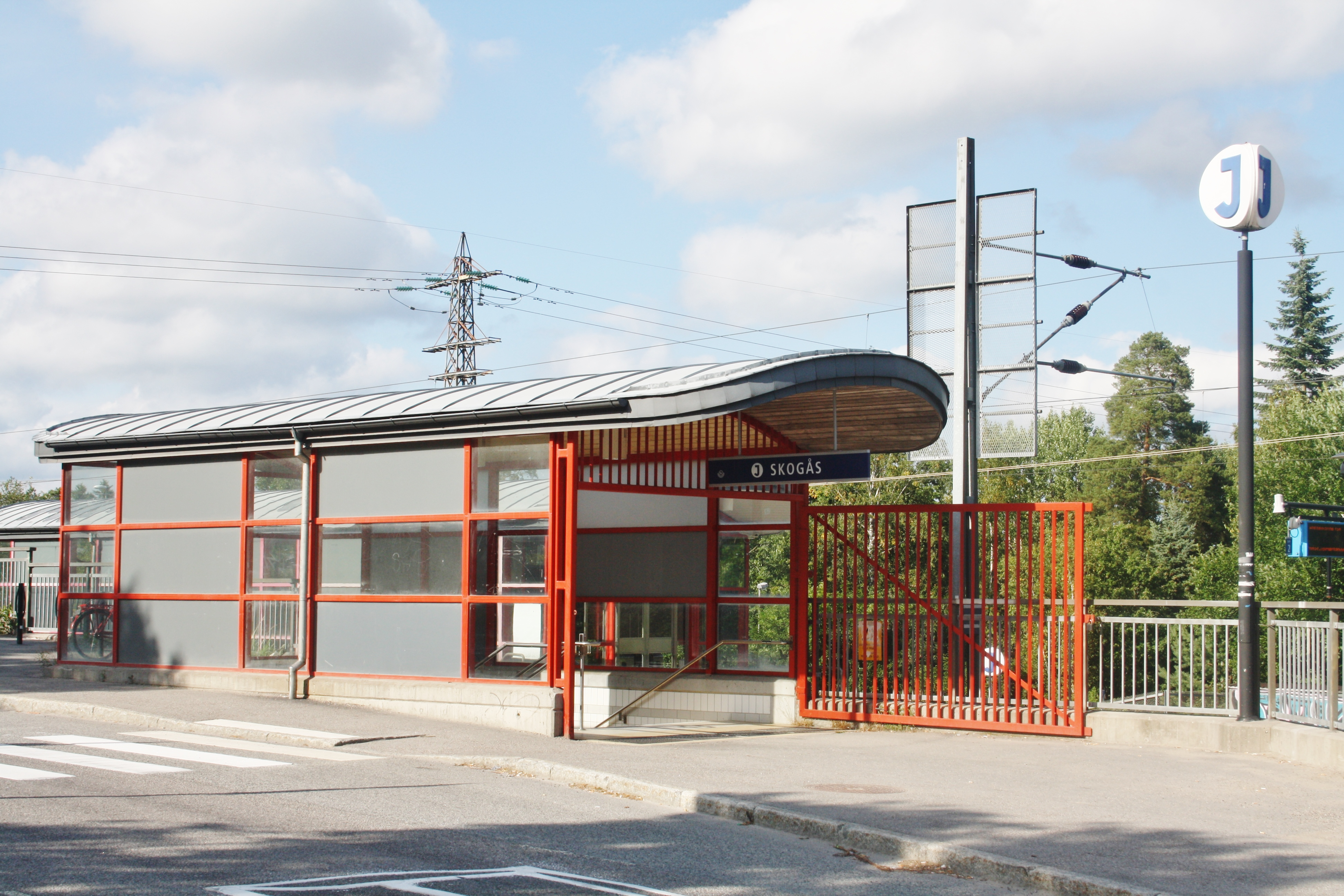
Station entrance at Skogås.

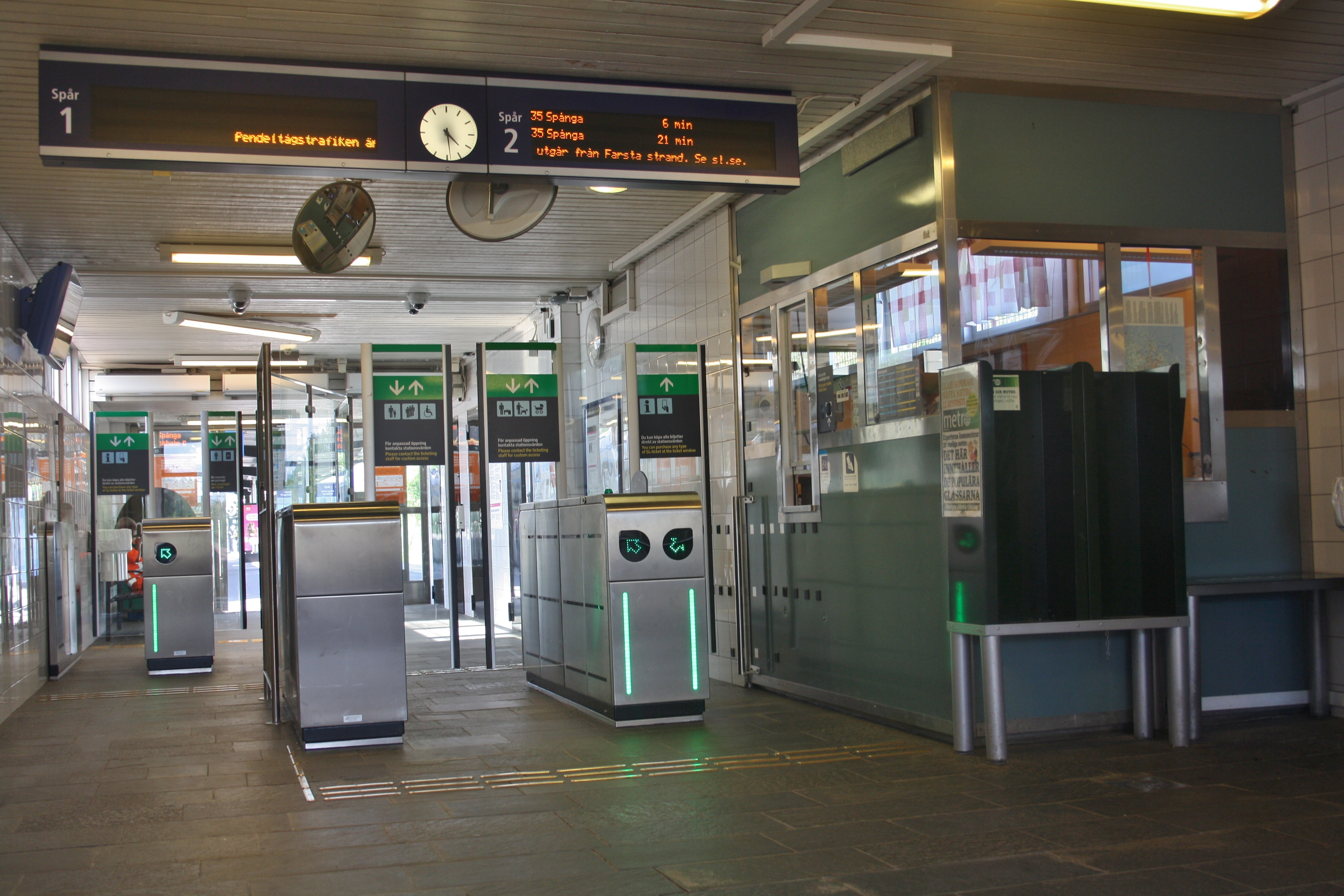
Ticket barriers at Skogås.

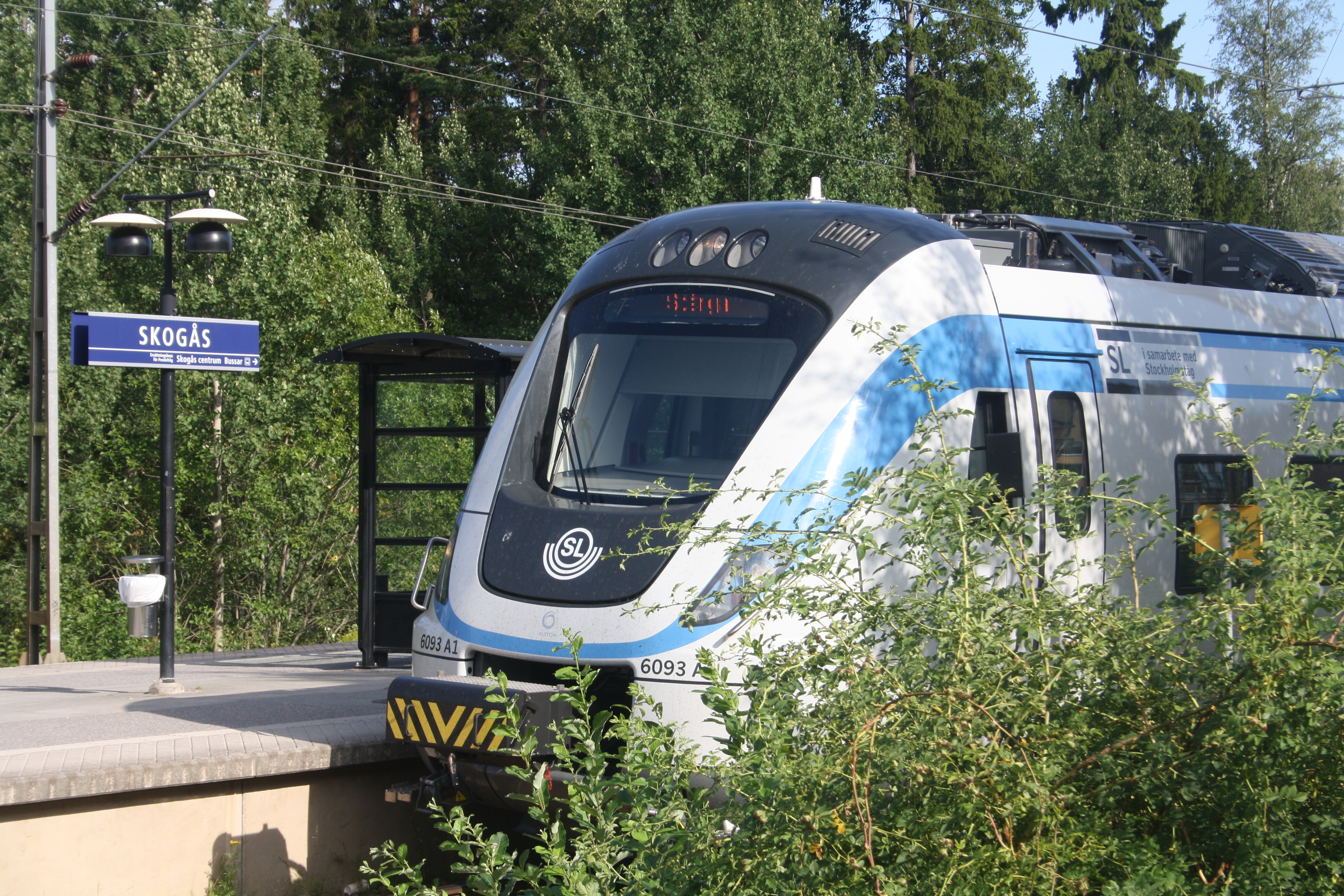
X60 train at Skogås.

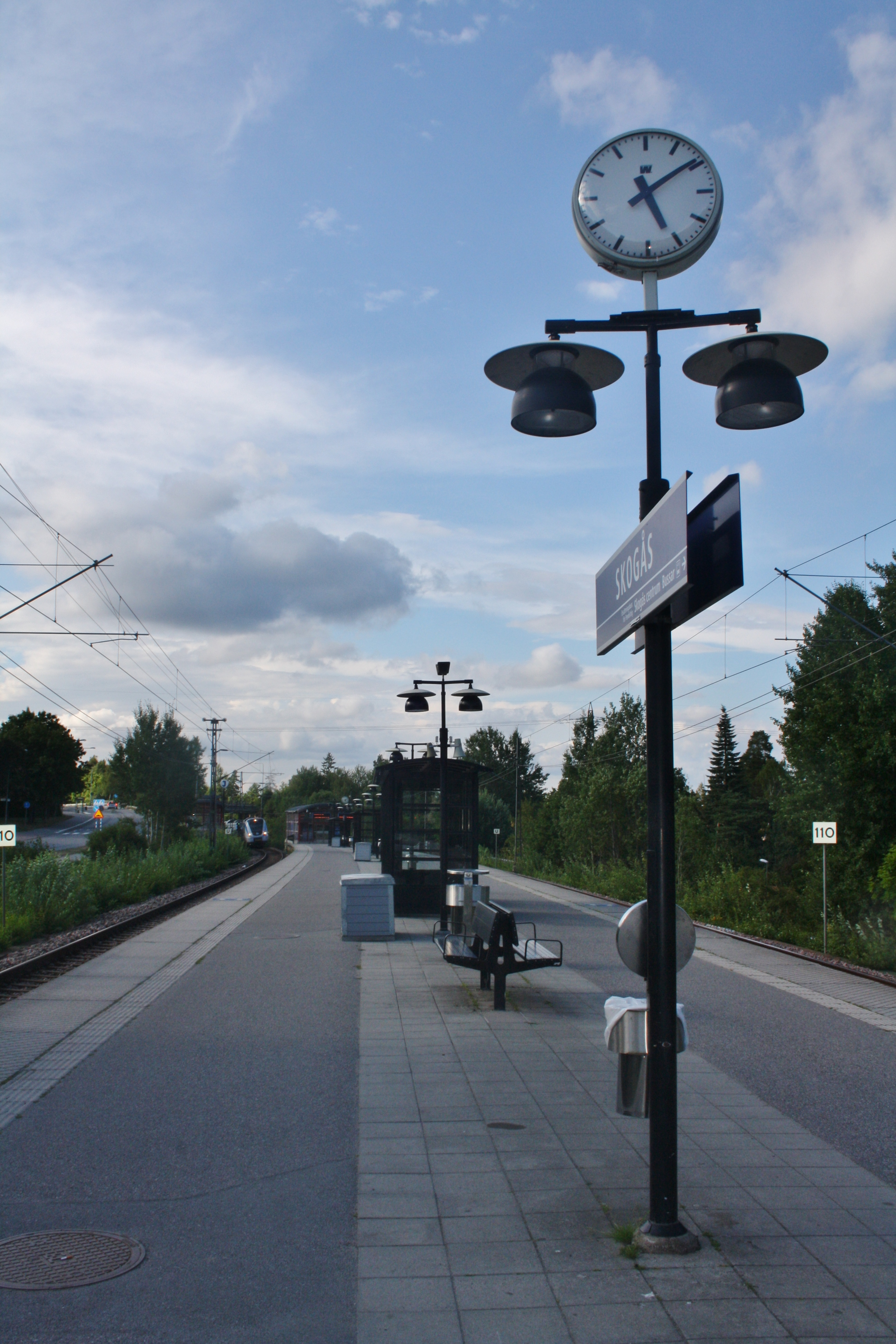
Platform at Skogås.

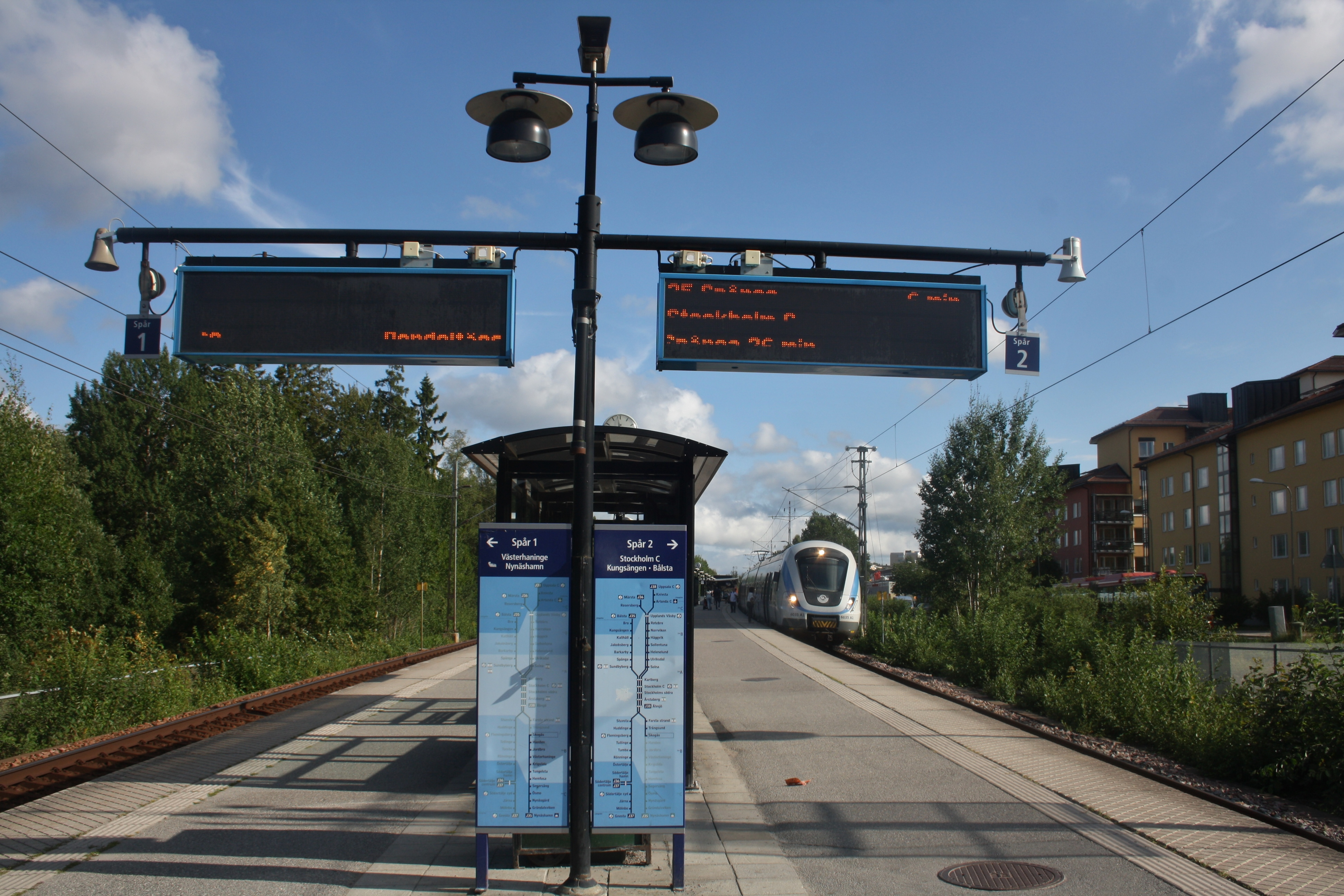
Platform at Skogås with X60 train in the background.
