= Swedish Railway Inspectorate =

Defunct Swedish government agency for railway safety

- Järnvägsinspektionen (Swedish)

Agency overview
- Formed: 1988
- Dissolved: 1 July 2004

The Swedish Railway Inspectorate (Järnvägsinspektionen) was a government agency in Sweden between 1988 and 2004 responsible for supervising railway safety. The agency was established in 1988 after reorganizations of the Swedish State Railways (Statens Järnvägar). Its formation was motivated by the increasing number of serious railway accidents in Sweden during the 1980s.

It was authorised to grant permits and approve railway infrastructure and vehicles, in accordance with the Undergrounds and Tramways Safety Act (1990:1157). Furthermore, it also performed its own investigations of serious accidents. The agency was dissolved on 1 July 2004, when Sweden implemented the EU's first railway package. Its responsibilities was subsequently assumed by the Swedish Railway Board (Järnvägsstyrelsen).
