= BK Tåg =

Swedish railway company

BK Tåg AB
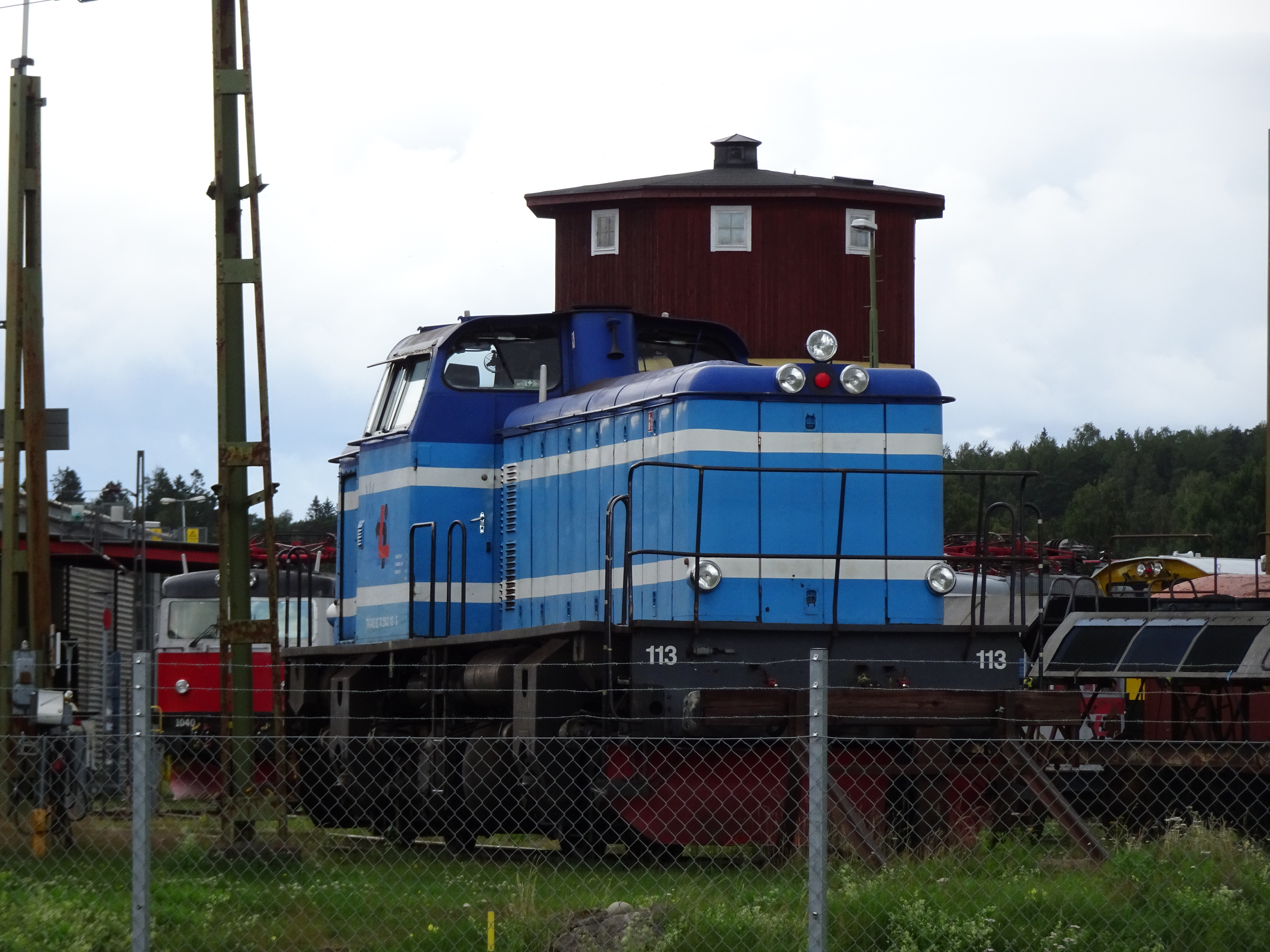
- A BK Tåg liveried SJ T43 in operation with Tågab.
- Type: Private
- Industry: Passenger and freight rail operations
- Founded: 1990
- Defunct: March 21, 2005
- Fate: Bankruptcy
- Key people: Gerhard Wennerström, CEO (2005)
- Number of employees: 150 (2005)

BK Tåg AB, trading as BK Tåg, was a Swedish train operator. BK Tåg was one of the first private operators on the Swedish railway network after its liberalisation. When they won the tender for the operation of Krösatågen in 1989 it was the first time a private company competed with SJ in modern times. During the 1990s BK tåg experienced growth in both the passenger and freight sector including regional trains between Borlänge and Malung. In 2002 the company signed several agreements to operate container trains and intermodal transports including transports of LPG and paper. During this time BK Tåg was a serious competitor to more established operators including Green Cargo and CargoNet.

The company experienced losses and struggled to make a profit on passenger operations and filed for bankruptcy in march 2005. 150 employees were left without a job and the passenger contracts left unfulfilled were picked up by other operators including state owned SJ. Some parts of the freight operation were picked up by other juridical entities or were sold of.

== Rolling Stock ==
BK tåg exclusively utilised diesel locomotives on their frieght services, the majority of them were former SJ.

In January 1997 BK trains had the following units in their fleet.

Class	Number	Unit numbers	Notes
SJ T43	3	229, 252, 254	
SJ Tc	1	294	
V96	1	101	On loan from ČKD
SJ Z43	1	333	

In January 2000 BK trains had the following units in their fleet.

Class	Number	Unit numbers	Notes
SJ T43	3	229, 252, 254	
SJ Tc	1	294	
SJ Z43	3	333, 472, 478	
SJ Z67	1	648	
SJ Ma	1	825	
SJ Y1	4	1300, 1320, 1321, 1331	

== List of passenger operations ==
In 1989 BK Tåg received their first passenger contract to operate Krösatågen in Småland, during the 90s and 00s BK expanded and started passenger services on the following lines:

- Nässjö–Hultsfred–Oskarshamn, Nässjö–Åseda, Nässjö–Halmstad/Torup–Hyltebruk and Jönköping–Värnamo, during a four-year period starting in 1990.
- Malung–Borlänge C in Dalarna from the 9 June 1992 until 11 June 1994.
- Nässjö–Tranås from 10 June 1996 and Nässjö–Sävsjö from 5 August 1996
- Simrishamn–Ystad, during 1995–1999 marketed as SiTy-tågen.
- Linköping–Kalmar (Stångådalsbanan) from 25 june 2002 on a five-year contract that never was fulfilled as on the 2 May 2005 SJ took over operations on the line.
- Linköping–Västervik (Tjustbanan) from 25 June 2002 on a five-year contract that never was fulfilled as on the 2 May 2005 SJ took over operations on the line.
