= Morskogen =

Woodland in Norway

Coordinates: 60°28′13″N 11°14′22″E

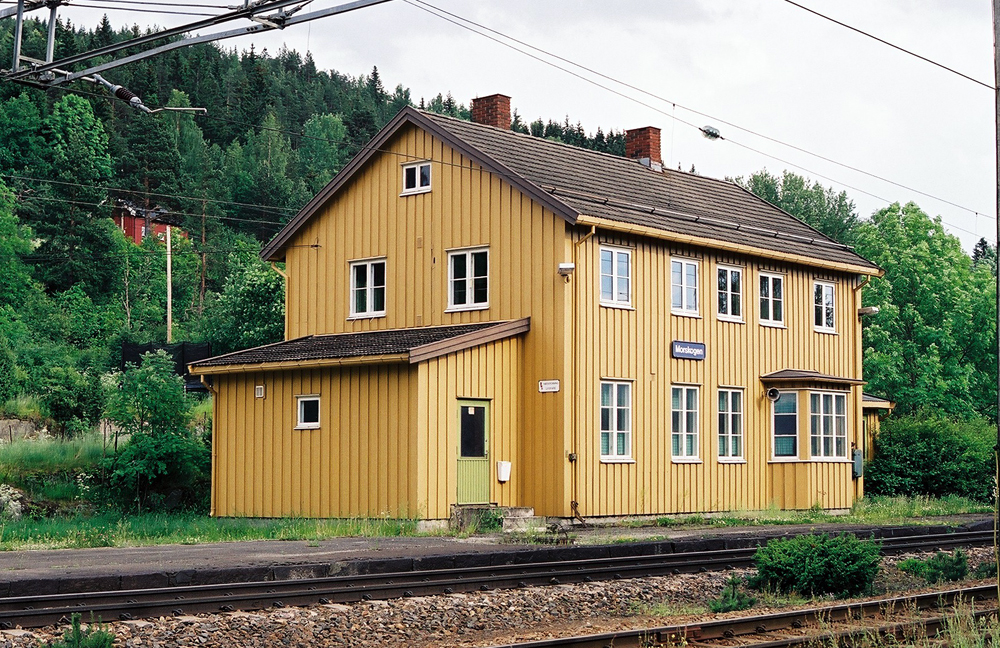
Morskogen railway station

Morskogen is a stretch of woodland along the shores of lake Mjøsa, Norway's biggest lake. It is located along the border of Eidsvoll Municipality in Akershus county and Stange Municipality in Innlandet county.

Morskogen was a battlefield in 1940 between the invading German Wehrmacht and the Norwegian Army, which ended in victory for the Germans.

In current times, it is best known for being right along the European route E6 highway and having one of Norway’s most dangerous roads, with an unusually high frequency of deaths caused by traffic accidents. The Morskogen railway station (in Eidsvoll Municipality) is a former railway station on the Dovre Line. The station was established in 1880 and operated until 1983. The Ulvin railway tunnel is located in Morskogen.
