= Banverket =

Swedish rail administration

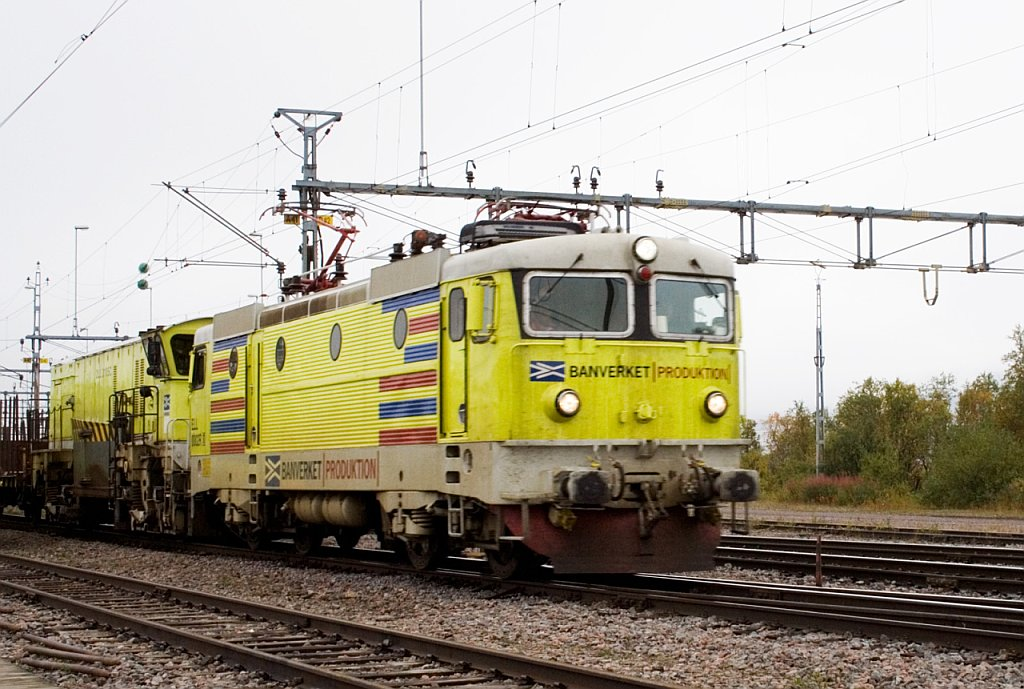
- Banverket Rc engine with a construction train near the Malmbanan depot at Kiruna
- Company type: State administrative authority (Swedish: Statlig förvaltningsmyndighet)
- Predecessor: Swedish State Railways (Statens Järnvägar)
- Founded: 1988
- Defunct: 31 March 2010
- Fate: Merged with the Swedish Road Administration
- Successor: Swedish Transport Administration (Trafikverket)
- Headquarters: Borlänge, Sweden
- Area served: Sweden
- Products: Rail infrastructure
- Owner: The state (100%)

The Swedish National Rail Administration (Swedish: Banverket) was a Swedish state administrative authority which acted as owner on behalf of the State and maintained virtually all main railway lines in Sweden; except for short sidings for freight, heritage railways, the Stockholm Metro, local railways in the Stockholm area (Roslagsbanan & Saltsjöbanan), and the tramways in Gothenburg, Norrköping and Stockholm. Its headquarters was located in Borlänge.

Banverket was formed in 1988, when Swedish State Railways (Statens Järnvägar - SJ) was split in two parts, leaving SJ as mainly a train operator (both passenger and freight) and as a real estate owner, only to be split again in 2001.

== History ==
During 1988, Banverket was created, its functions having been previously carried out by the Swedish State Railways. The restructuring was a politically-driven move, Swedish politicians and industry officials having successfully advocated for adopting the model of a vertically-separated railway. Conceptually, the newly created Administration would act similar to the pre-existing Swedish roads authority, charging operators for licenses to operate upon the railway network; however, the revenue from this approach was at no point viewed as a suitable replacement for state-provided funding of the railways.

The Administration set about introducing competition on Sweden's railways; Swedish regional authorities were able to issue competitive tenders to operate their local railway networks. While the rolling stock generally belonged to these regions, its operation was interchangeable from one operator to the next. Various private sector companies, such as the native company BK Tag and French-owned Connex, entered the train operator market; while Connex operated several major commuter services around Stockholm, BK Tag did not last long in the business. The Swedish State Railways was permitted to compete for these tenders as well; it was able to retain roughly 70 per cent of the tendered regional networks. The franchises for operating local lines typically last five years, although in some cases these lasted for as long as ten years.

Competition in the regional rail market was pursued more rapidly than in the longer distance inter-regional routes; for a time, train travel between major city pairs such as Stockholm and Gothenburg, was effectively a monopoly held by the Swedish State Railways. By 2005, this arrangement had become politically controversial and the Swedish parliament hotly debated the issue that year autumn. Beyond the operations, various services such as train maintenance and overhauls was also partially privatised; the Swedish State Railways' X 2000 fleet of tilting trains was overhauled during the mid-2000s by Euromaint, a private company spun off from the state-owned operator. A key responsibility of the Administration was to ensure that the state-owned railway infrastructure was safeguarded and appropriately maintained to ensure operations inline with established policies and government targets; it directed substantial efforts into increasing the efficiency of maintenance operations.

Starting in 1998, Banverket initiated a continuous programme of joint punctuality improvement work between itself and the major railway companies based in the Swedish rail sector. Early on, this process was organised around regional action groups along clear geographical boundaries that largely focused on causes of disruption and the necessary measures to improve punctuality. As the process of deregulation took hold, various operators disappeared and were created, while it came to be recognised that these regional action groups were not effectively concentrating on the resolution of disruption or addressing the causes of such. Accordingly, in 2004, the regional orientation was discarded in favour of focusing on individual journeys and modes of transport for evaluating punctuality and the corresponding improvement efforts. Furthermore, specially appointed train administrators became responsible for following up on, and drawing attention to, those trains that frequently had problems with punctuality while operators started specifying their own quality targets for the trains so that all parties could know when acceptable quality levels had been achieved.

During 1997, the Administration launched the Swedish International Railway radio (SIR) project, being the first railway organisation in the world to do so and thus played a pioneering role in the field. Throughout much of the following decade, construction of the resultant MobiSIR (Mobiles in SIR) GSM-R radio communication network proceeded; by 2005, approximately 800 sites had been completed alongside the entirety of Sweden's mainline railway. Two years later, the construction of radio infrastructure to cover the remaining 2,500 kilometres of low traffic lines was completed, after which all communication pertaining to railway operations was run upon MobiSIR.

In the early 2000s, the Administration adopted a new strategic solution for the grinding of across many of Sweden's conventional lines after successful use of railgrinders on a preventative basis on the Malmbanan. New funding models and griding profiles were adopted with largely positive results, such as the extension of track life in places as well as improved comfort levels for the travelling public.

In Easter of 2008, the Administration undertook the largest ever signal replacement scheme in Sweden was undertaken at Stockholm Central Station. During May 2008, the Administration signed contracts with several companies, including Bombardier Transportation, Balfour Beatty, and Ansaldo for the roll-out of the European Railway Traffic Management System (ERTMS). Under these contracts, two pilot ERTMS Level 2 installations were deployed as part of the modernisations of the Ådalsbanan and of the Haparandabanan routes; furthermore, these pilot lines were the precursor to the wider deployment of ERTMS, under which several major lines would be equipped with the system, a process that would continue into the following decade.

Throughout the late 2000s, the Administration adopted an increasingly customer-centric focus; this included the pursuit of ever-greater levels of reliability and punctuality while also making efforts to stop spiraling costs of major investment schemes. This was in part directed by the Swedish government as well as being the result of market changes and lessons learnt. The vast majority of its staff, approximately 1,530 people in 2007, belonged to the Operations Division, which delivered track access to the various operators along with various functions from planning to daily traffic management and maintenance.

Prior to 2004, the Swedish Railway Inspectorate (Swedish: Järnvägsinspektionen) was a part of the Swedish Rail Administration; it ceased to be following the formation of the Swedish Rail Agency (Swedish: Järnvägsstyrelsen) which took over its responsibilities. That agency was in turn incorporated into the newly formed Swedish Transport Agency (Swedish: Transportstyrelsen) in 2009. During 2010, the Swedish Government directed a merger with the Swedish Road Administration (Swedish: Vägverket) to create the new Swedish Transport Administration (Swedish: Trafikverket), and the subsidiary responsible for railway maintenance was spun off in a separate aktiebolag, Infranord.

== List of directors-general ==
- 1988–1995: Jan Brandborn
- 1995–1997: Monica Andersson
- 1997–2005: Bo Bylund
- 2006–2008: Per-Olof Granbom
- 2008–2010: Minoo Akhtarzand
