= Harpers Ferry Center =

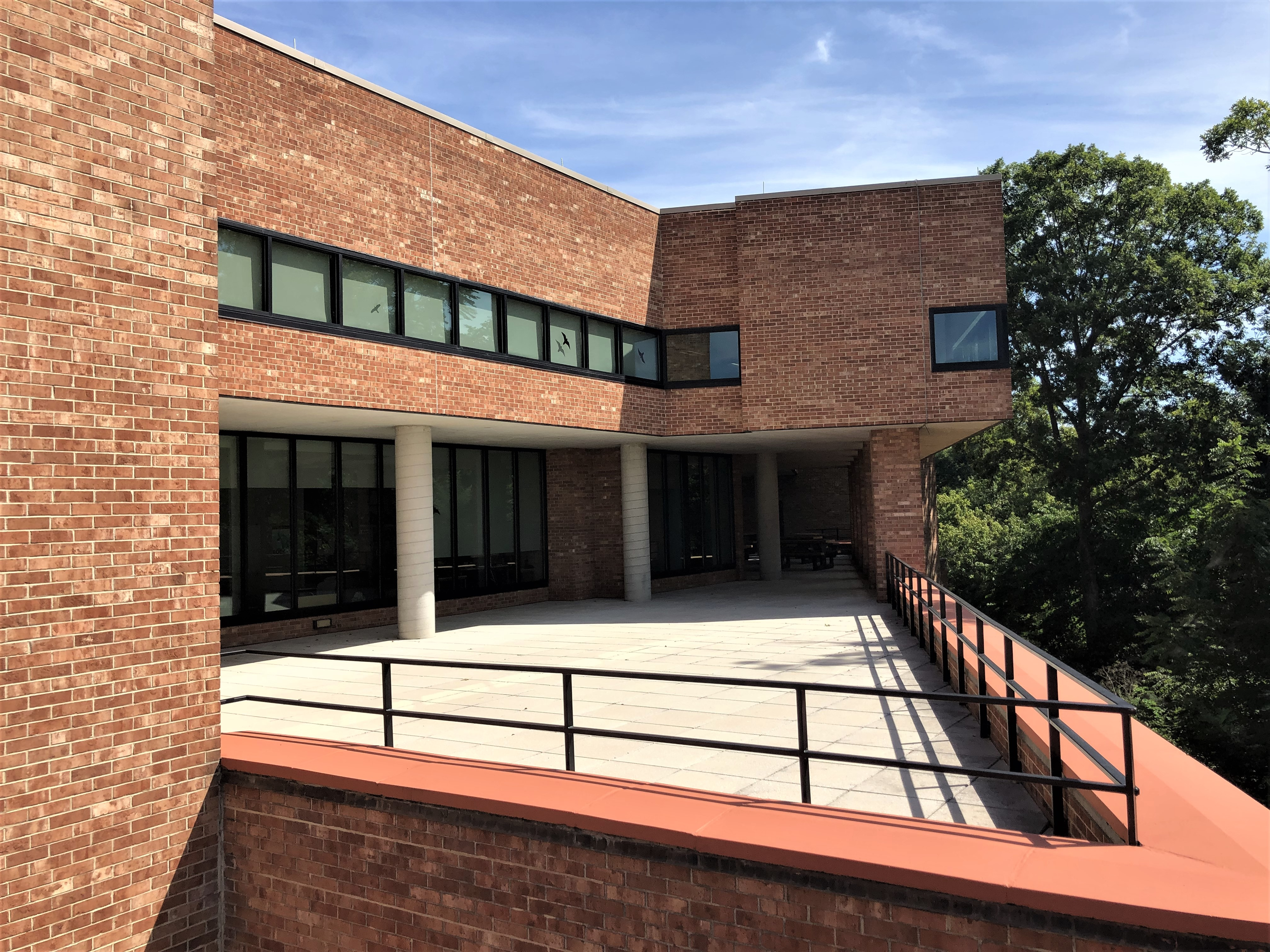
- The Interpretive Design Center building on Camp Hill in Harpers Ferry, West Virginia

Agency overview
- Formed: March 1970
- Jurisdiction: Federal government of the United States
- Headquarters: Harpers Ferry, West Virginia, U.S.
- Parent agency: National Park Service
- Website: www.nps.gov/subjects/hfc/

Harpers Ferry Center (HFC) is a National Park Service (NPS) service center in Harpers Ferry, West Virginia, that provides interpretive media and related services to units of the National Park System. Its work includes producing and supporting exhibits, publications (including park brochures), films and audiovisual programs, mobile and digital products, interpretive plans, signs, and wayside exhibits, and providing museum conservation services and technical assistance for media projects. HFC is also home to the NPS History Collection and the HFC Commissioned Art Collection.

== History ==
In the 1960s the NPS reorganized interpretive functions—including publications, audiovisual programs, and museums—within a consolidated program of interpretation and visitor services, a change associated with Director George B. Hartzog Jr. and interpretation chief William C. Everhart. Planning for a centralized interpretive media center at Harpers Ferry led to the construction of the Interpretive Design Center (IDC) on Camp Hill in Harpers Ferry; the facility was designed by architect Ulrich Franzen and built in 1969, with operations beginning in March 1970.

The center's location is within the boundaries of Harpers Ferry National Historical Park, on the former campus area of Storer College. The NPS acquired and reused multiple Storer College buildings for administrative and program purposes following the school's closure; surviving structures on the campus include buildings documented in the Historic American Buildings Survey (HABS) as NPS properties associated with the Harpers Ferry Center.

== Functions ==
HFC provides interpretive media services to parks across the NPS, including project consultation, planning, design and production support, and technical standards for media and visitor information systems.

=== Interpretive planning and project support ===
HFC supports interpretive planning as a strategic process for defining interpretation and education goals, visitor experience recommendations, and accessibility considerations for parks, and it provides project management and technical assistance for media development.

=== Media products ===
HFC's work includes, among other products and services:

- Publications, including creation and reprinting support for park brochures (commonly known as “Unigrids”).
- Audiovisual and film products, including video, audio, and interactive multimedia programs and technical assistance for park audiovisual systems.
- Cartography and mapping, including brochure maps and other mapping products and symbol libraries used in NPS media.
- Digital media, including support for mobile content and applications.
- Indoor exhibits, produced through a combination of contracting and in-house planning/design support for park exhibit projects.
- Signs and wayside exhibits, including standards and planning support for identity, guidance, and visitor information signage and waysides.

=== Museum conservation ===
HFC provides conservation services for NPS museum collections, including treatments, assessments, exhibit guidance, emergency response, and training, and it describes its conservation program as the largest within the NPS.

== Collections ==
=== NPS History Collection ===
The NPS History Collection at HFC includes archival materials documenting the agency's history, management, and culture, including millions of documents and objects, photographic images, and oral-history interviews; the collection is available for research by appointment.

=== HFC Commissioned Art Collection ===
The HFC Commissioned Art Collection contains more than 11,000 pieces of artwork produced or acquired for interpretive media projects; it is maintained as both a physical and digital collection and is available for research by appointment.

== Facilities and architecture ==
The center's principal facility is the Interpretive Design Center building on Camp Hill in Harpers Ferry. The building was designed by architect Ulrich Franzen, with design completed in 1967 and construction beginning in 1968; the facility was completed in late 1969 and occupied for NPS interpretive media functions in March 1970. Renovation and preservation work on the building has been discussed in the context of mid-century NPS facilities associated with Mission 66.

== Images ==
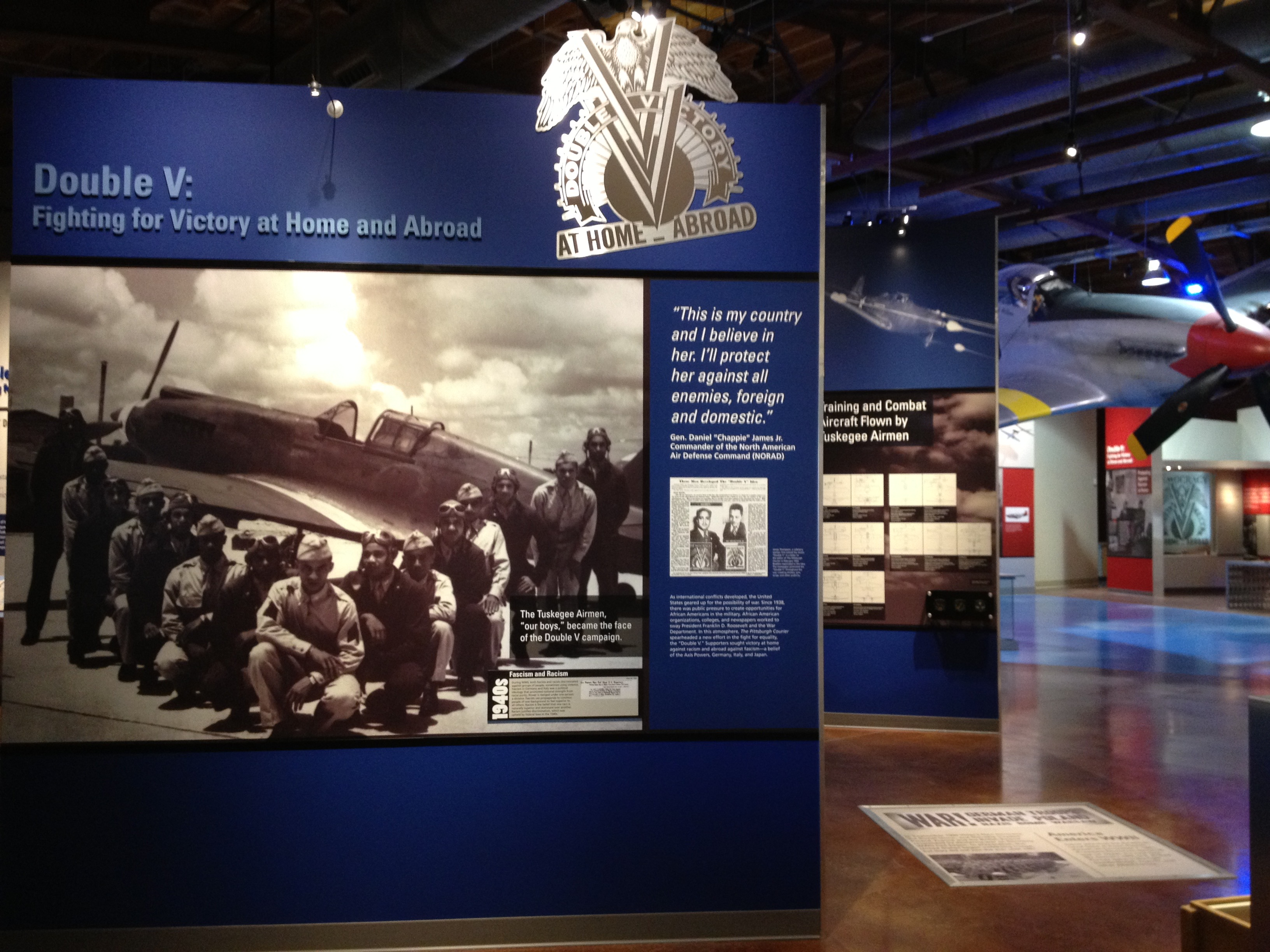
Double V Campaign exhibit at Tuskegee Airmen National Historic Site designed by Harpers Ferry Center

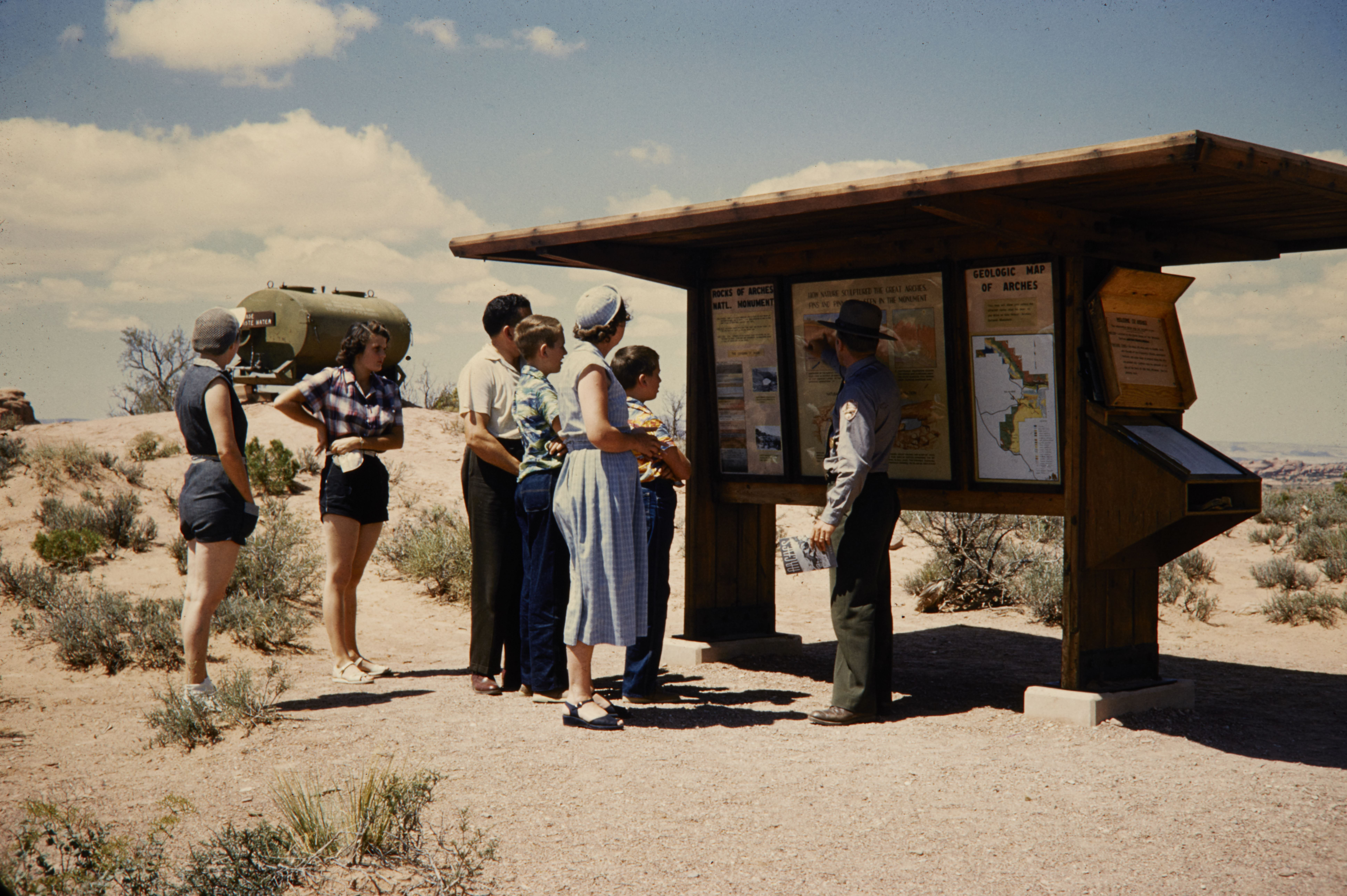
Visitors at a wayside exhibit in then Arches National Monument

== See also ==
- National Park Service
- Harpers Ferry National Historical Park
- Heritage interpretation
- Mission 66
- Ulrich Franzen
