= Unigrids =

Standardized brochure and map layout system used by the U.S. National Park Service

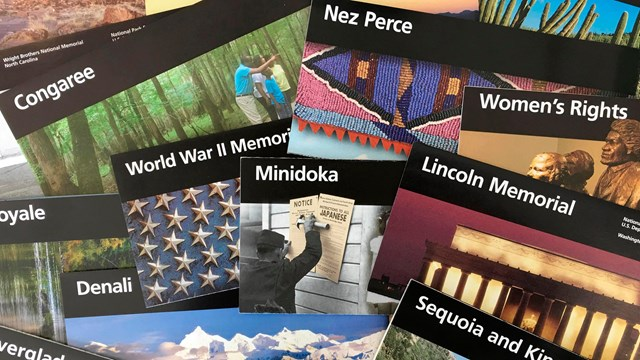
NPS Unigrids

The Unigrid (also called the Unigrid system) is a standardized graphic-design and production system used by the National Park Service (NPS) for its official visitor brochures (often called park brochures) and related informational folders. Developed in 1977 under NPS publications leadership and modernist designer Massimo Vignelli, it replaced a wide range of earlier brochure sizes and styles with a modular grid, standardized folding panels, and consistent production specifications intended to reduce printing complexity and cost while maintaining flexibility in layout and content.

== History ==
As the National Park System grew, NPS brochures were produced in many formats and folding methods, complicating design and print production. In 1977, NPS Publications Chief Vincent (Vince) Gleason sought a more efficient approach and enlisted Massimo Vignelli to develop a comprehensive design and production system that became the Unigrid. The first park brochure produced using the Unigrid is identified by the NPS as the 1978 brochure for Clara Barton National Historic Site.

In 1985, the Unigrid program received a Presidential Design Award (administered through the National Endowment for the Arts) recognizing the effectiveness of the system in standardizing routine decisions while supporting a wide range of subject matter and detailed execution.

== Format and design ==
=== Grid and panel structure ===
Unigrid brochures are built from standardized folded panels that form a modular grid for placing text, photographs or illustrations, and maps. The NPS describes the basic building blocks as panels measuring approximately 4 by 8¼ inches (defined by fold lines). Federal printing specifications describe ordered trim sizes as multiples of a basic "unigrid leaf" of 99 × 210 mm (3-29/32 × 8-9/32 in).

The original Unigrid design specifications describe ten basic formats derived from a larger base sheet (B6) subdivided into twelve panels per side, enabling multiple brochure sizes and folds to be imposed on standard press sheets with minimal waste. The NPS notes that formats can be one or two panels wide and up to six panels long, calculated to maximize use of a standard 25 × 38 inch press sheet and reduce paper waste.

=== Title bar, typography, and visual identity ===
A defining feature of the system is a consistent title treatment associated with a black band and standardized typography, contributing to a recognizable NPS brochure identity. The NPS reports that original Unigrid typefaces were Helvetica and Times Roman, and that current standard typefaces are Frutiger and NPS Rawlinson; the NPS arrowhead emblem was added to the black band in 1999.

=== Maps and cartographic standards ===
Unigrid brochures commonly pair interpretive or logistical text with a standardized visitor map format. The broader Unigrid publications program also sought to improve the clarity and consistency of park maps, including increased use of shaded-relief depiction during the program's development and maturation.

== Production and distribution ==
Unigrid brochures are produced through the NPS Unigrid Brochure Program at the Harpers Ferry Center, which works with individual parks to create new brochures and revise existing ones. The NPS reports that once developed, brochures are typically reprinted every one to two years with updates as needed, and that the Publications Office prints on average about 20 million copies per year for distribution across the National Park System. Federal printing contract specifications describe an order volume on the order of hundreds of print orders per year and potential annual totals that can reach tens of millions of copies, depending on demand and print schedules.

== Accessibility and digital formats ==
The NPS produces accessible variants of Unigrid brochure content, including braille transcriptions of official park brochures and audio-described versions distributed through the UniDescription (UniD) project and mobile application. The UniD workflow supports additional outputs (including HTML5, MP3 audio, and text files) for web distribution and other sharing methods.

== Reception and legacy ==
Design and museum-history sources describe the Unigrid as a widely used example of a government design system that standardizes production while accommodating varied subject matter across parks and programs. The system's influence has also been cited in later NPS digital design efforts that adapt brochure-era grid concepts for web and mobile layouts.

== Gallery ==
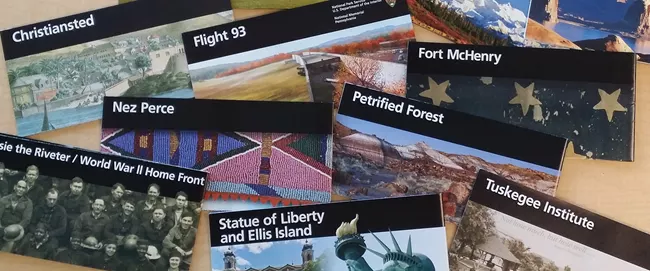
A collection of Unigrids by National Park Service

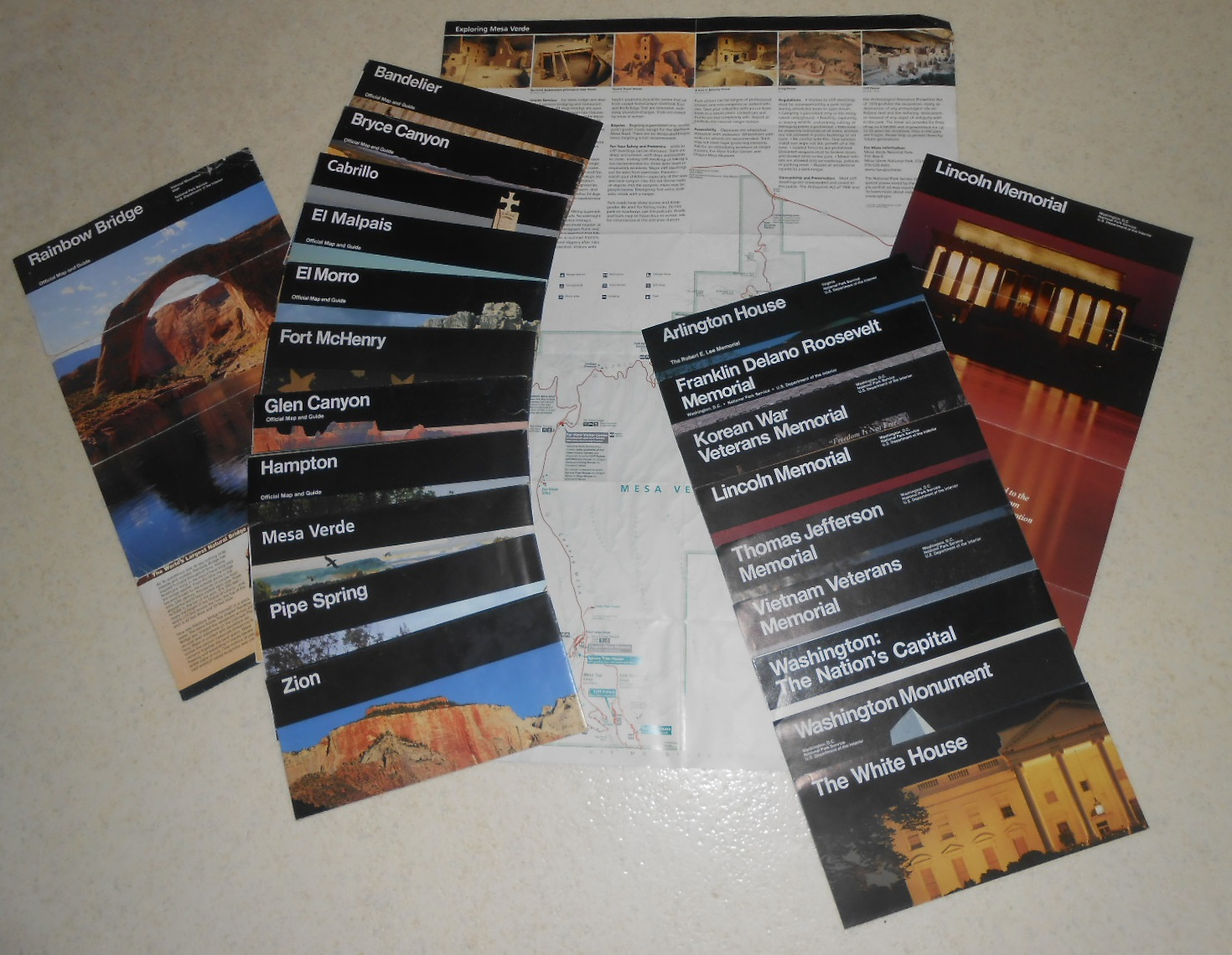
A collection of older Unigrid brochures by National Park Service. Note that the newer versions use a slightly different font and do not have the "Official Map and Guide" subtitle.

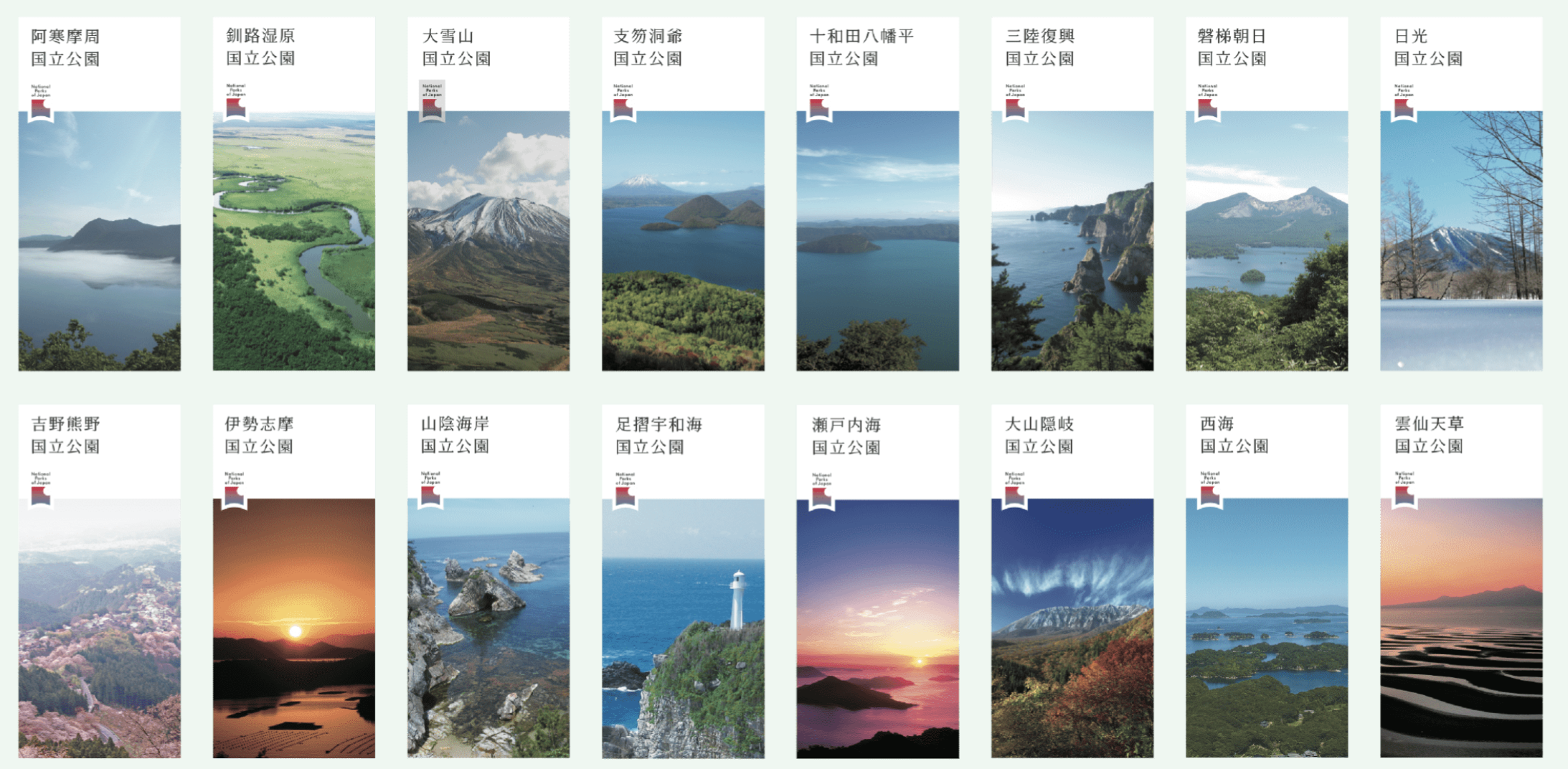
Counterparts of National Parks of Japan

== See also ==
- National Park Service
- Harpers Ferry Center
- Massimo Vignelli
- Information design
- Wayfinding
- Cartography
