= Infranord =

Swedish railway maintenance contractor

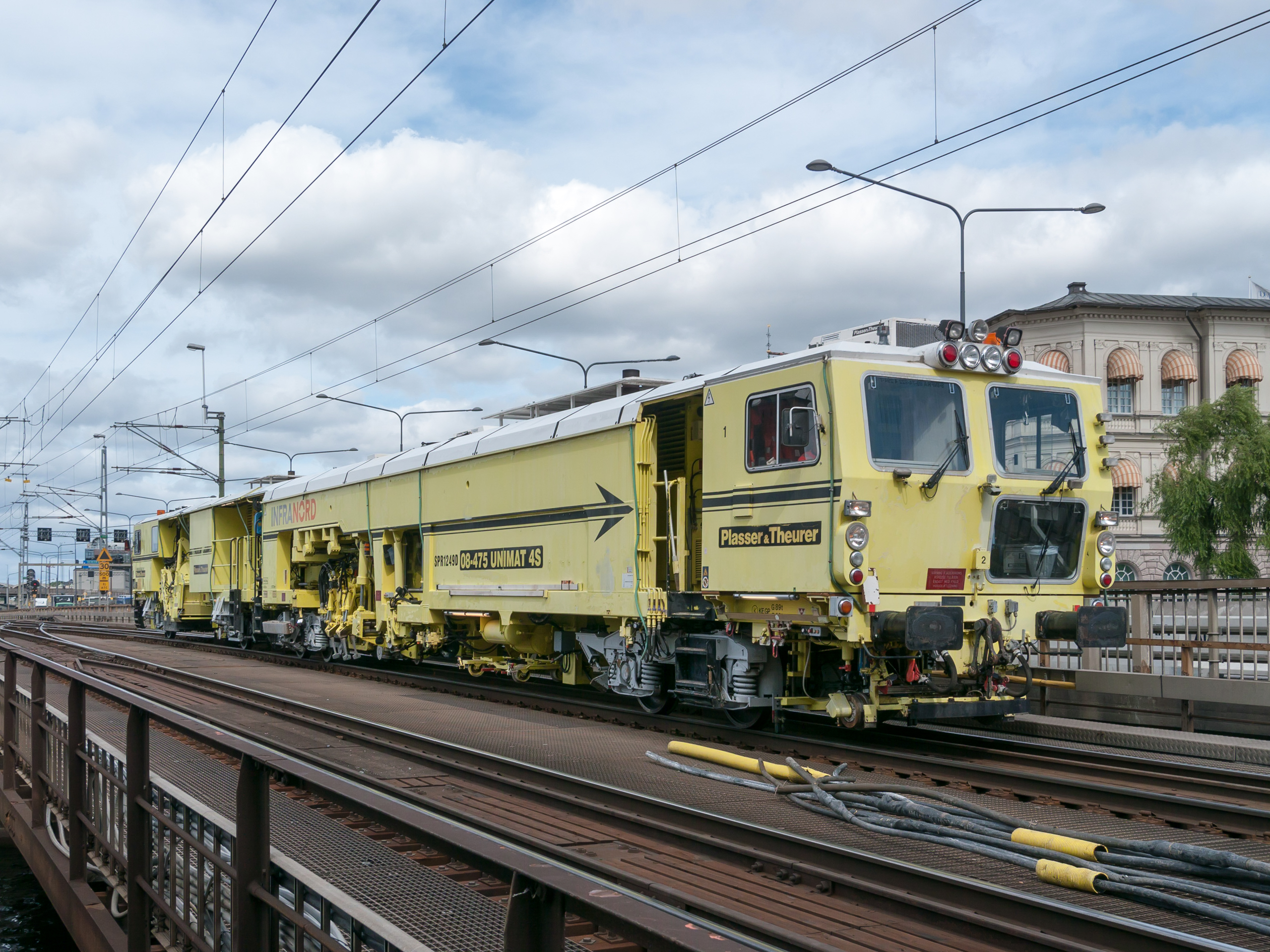
Infranord ballast tamper on Norra järnvägsbron, Stockholm

Infranord is a wholly owned Swedish Government enterprise and a railway contractor, providing engineering services to build and maintain railways. The company is the result of a spin-off when the Swedish Transport Administration was established in 2010, following the merger between the Swedish Rail Administration (Swedish: Banverket) and the Swedish Road Administration (Swedish: Vägverket). Today, the company has a presence in all Scandinavian countries, with operations in Sweden and Norway.

The company had 2,500 employees and a turnover of over SEK 4,400 million in 2012, and its head-office is located in Solna.

== See also ==
- Svevia
- Government-owned corporation
- List of government enterprises of Sweden
