= Kolomoen =

Area of Stange Municipality, Norway

Coordinates: 60.6986°N 11.2667°E

Kolomoen is an area in Stange Municipality in Innlandet county, Norway, situated about 7 kilometers (4 mi) south of the village of Stange.

The locality is most notable as the site of an interchange. It is the northernmost part of the European Road E6 which is built as a four-lane controlled-access highway. At Kolomoen National Road 3 branches off from the E6, and the E6 continues towards Hamar as a two-lane expressway.
