= Swedish State Railways =

State-owned railway in Sweden (1887–2000)

- Native name: Statens Järnvägar
- Company type: Government Agency
- Founded: 1 June 1888
- Defunct: 1 January 2001
- Fate: Breakup in two phases
- Successor: SJ AB (passenger trains); Green Cargo AB (freight trains); Banverket (infrastructure); Jernhusen AB (stations)
- Headquarters: Stockholm, Sweden
- Area served: Scandinavia
- Products: Rail Transport
- Owner: The State

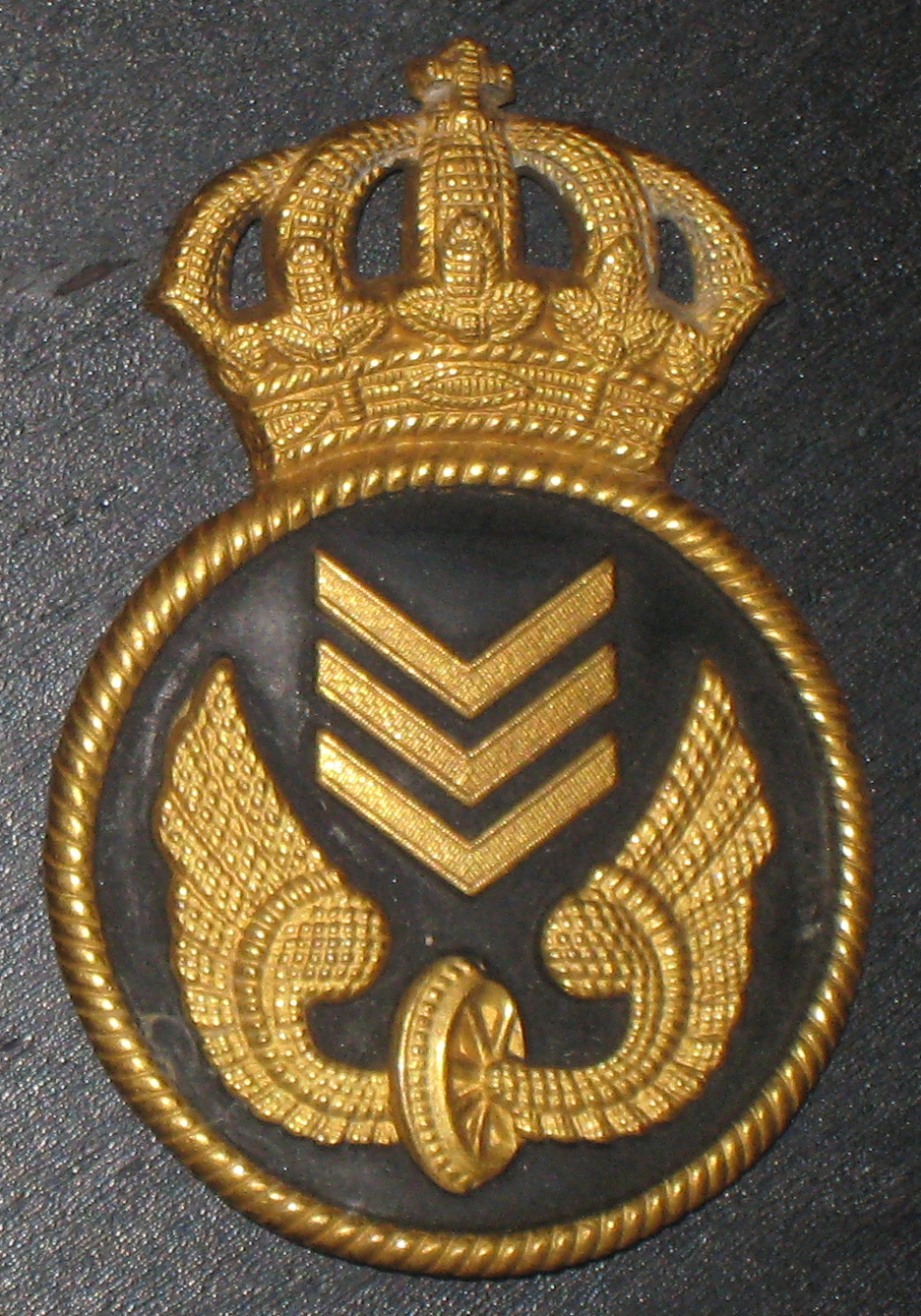
Older badge of Statens järnvägar

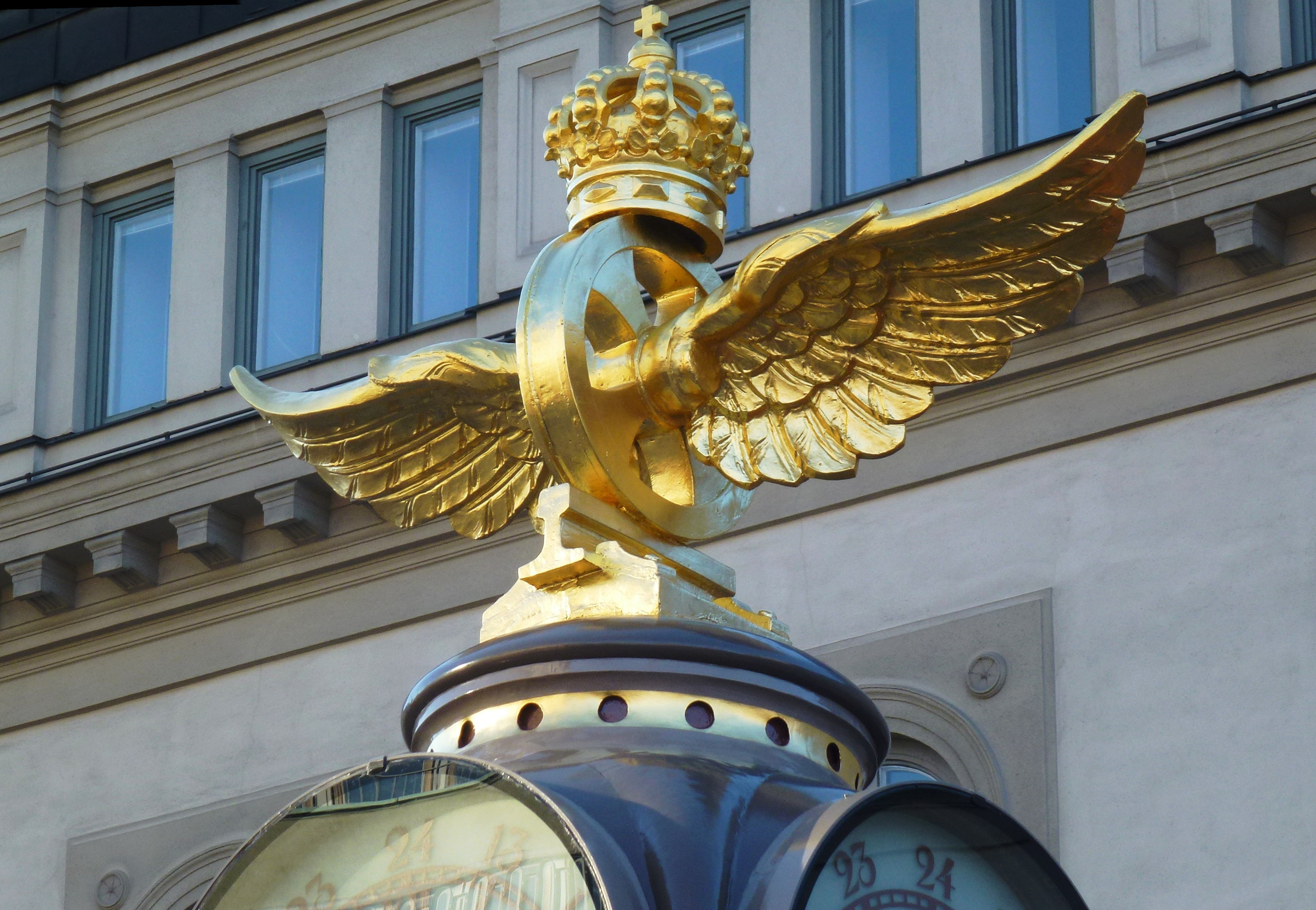
Winged wheel of SJ

The Swedish State Railways (Swedish: Statens Järnvägar) or SJ, originally the Royal Railway Board (Swedish: Kungl. Järnvägsstyrelsen), was the former government agency responsible for operating the state-owned railways in Sweden.

== History ==
The Swedish State Railways was created on 1 June 1888 as an agency belonging to the Ministry for Civil Service Affairs, with the task of managing all state-owned railway lines in Sweden, and was transferred to the Ministry of Communications in 1920.

In 1988, the rail tracks themselves were transferred to the Swedish Rail Administration (Swedish: Banverket), and in the upcoming years parts of SJ were gradually transformed into limited companies as a result of the open access obligation introduced by EU Directive 91/440. SJ was disbanded in 2001, with the assets transferred to seven separate companies, the first three owned by the Swedish government and the latter four being privatized:

- SJ AB, usually called SJ, the passenger train operator
- Green Cargo, which operates freight trains
- Jernhusen, real estate
- EuroMaint, currently a part of CAF, train maintenance
- Unigrid, information technology
- TraffiCare, which provides terminal services, e.g. train cleaning and switching
- TrainTech Engineering, currently a part of SNC-Lavalin Rail & Transit, the technical unit.

Some of them have been sold to other companies, but SJ AB, Green Cargo and Jernhusen are still fully government owned (as of January 2026). Apart from these companies, Statens Järnvägar after 2001 continued to exist as a governmental agency, mainly dealing with the leasing of rail vehicles, but otherwise had no regular railroad activities. It was dismantled at the end of 2012 when that role was fully taken over by Trafikverket.
