= Svevia =

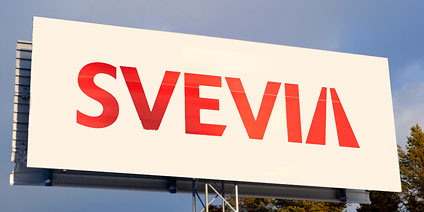
Svevia

Svevia is an independent public company which builds and operates roads and infrastructure in Sweden. Svevia is the fourth largest civil engineering company in the country, with approximately 1,900 employees and a turnover of SEK 8.1 billion (in 2020). It is the largest road operation and maintenance company in Sweden.

Svevia has its origins in the production division of the former Swedish Road Administration (Vägverket).

The company headquarters is in Stockholm. The chairman is Olof Ehrlén and the president and CEO is Anders Gustafsson.

== See also ==
- Infranord
