= Swedish Transport Administration =

Government agency in Sweden

- Trafikverket

Government agency overview
- Formed: April 1, 2010
- Preceding agencies: Swedish Rail Administration; Swedish Road Administration; Swedish Institute for Transport and Communications Analysis
- Headquarters: Borlänge, Sweden; 60.4864191°N 15.4086796°E
- Employees: 9864 (2023)
- Government agency executive: Roberto Maiorana, Director General
- Parent Government agency: Ministry of Rural Affairs and Infrastructure
- Website: trafikverket.se

The Swedish Transport Administration (Swedish: Trafikverket) is a government agency in Sweden. It is responsible for long-term infrastructure planning for transport: road, rail, shipping and aviation. It is responsible for constructing, operating and maintaining all state-owned roads and railways and operates many car ferry services.

While the agency is responsible for managing all aspects of the national road and rail network, most of the work is done by public procurement. For shipping and aviation, it only does planning and purchasing of unprofitable traffic.

The agency is a member of the Nordic Road Association.

== History ==
A special committee oversaw the effectiveness of the Swedish transport agencies during 2008 and 2009. A conclusion was reached that there would be significant gains compared with the then-present situation if a new agency responsible for long-term planning of the transport system for road, rail, maritime and air traffic was formed. Preparations started in the autumn of 2009, and the new authority began its work on 1 April 2010.

It took over all operations of the Road Administration (Vägverket) and the Rail Administration (Banverket), as well as parts of the responsibility of the Maritime Administration (Sjöfartsverket), Civil Aviation Administration (Luftfartsverket) and the Swedish Institute for Communications Analysis (SIKA). This creation of a single transport administration capped off a long process of deregulation where most of the day to day operations of the old administrations were split off as commercial companies.

=== Companies separated from predecessors of the Swedish Transport Administration ===
- Svevia, road construction and maintenance
- Infranord, railway construction and maintenance
- Vectura (acquired by Sweco), road and railway engineering.
- SJ AB, passenger train operator.
- Green Cargo, freight train operator.
- Euromaint (now owned by CAF), train maintenance.
- Jernhusen, owns railway related buildings, mainly railway stations.
- Swedavia, owns major profitable airports (smaller unprofitable airports are normally owned by municipalities and regions)

=== Other agencies within the transport sector ===
- Swedish Maritime Administration, maintains and regulates ship routes.
- Civil Aviation Administration, handles air traffic control and navigation infrastructure
- Swedish Transport Agency (Transportstyrelsen), the Swedish transport sector regulatory agency.

== See also ==
- Swedish Transport Administration electric road program
