= Swedish Transport Agency =

Swedish administrative authority

- Transportstyrelsen

Agency overview
- Formed: 1 January 2009
- Headquarters: Norrköping, Sweden
- Employees: 2,300 (2024)
- Agency executive: Joel Smith, Director general
- Parent department: Ministry of Infrastructure
- Website: transportstyrelsen.se

The Swedish Transport Agency (Swedish: Transportstyrelsen) is a Swedish government agency which is responsible for the regulation of rail, air, sea and road transport and its enforcement. It was formed on 1 January 2009, through a merger of several government agencies, including the Civil Aviation Administration, under the Ministry of Infrastructure.

It has its headquarters in Norrköping, Sweden.

== 2015 data leak ==
In September 2015, the Swedish Transport Agency decided to outsource the management of its database and other IT services to the IBM offices in the Czech Republic and Serbia.

The entire Swedish Transport Agency database was uploaded onto cloud servers belonging to these two companies, and some employees got full access to the database, as Sweden fired its IT technicians.

In March 2016 the Swedish Security Service realized what happened, and started an investigation, warning other government agencies that unauthorized foreigners were now in control of their IT systems after the STA had bypassed necessary security checks just to expedite the transition to the new IT system as they wanted to fire local IT staff (and many already found new jobs themselves).

Following this huge mishap, the agencies Director General Maria Ågren resigned, and authorities charged her in 2016. At the start of the month, a Swedish court found her guilty of negligence but the sentence passed down was ludicrous in the eyes of many citizens, with court docking half of her monthly salary as punishment. Maria Ågren was assigned the Director position in 2015 when the outsourcing was decided and contracted but not yet put into operation. The predecessor Staffan Widlert retired in 2015, leaving a large problem to his successor, and he did not get any penalty.

"Given how much the establishment has got each other's backs, this sentence was roughly equivalent to life in prison for a common person on the street, meaning they must have done something really awful to get not just a guilty verdict, but actually be fined half a month's salary," Rick Falkvinge commented on the sentence.

According to Falkvinge, the leak exposed:

- The weight capacity of all roads as well as bridges (which is crucial for warfare, and gives a lot idea about what roads are intended to be used as wartime airfields).
- Names, photos, and home addresses of fighter pilots in the Air Force.
- Names, photos, and home addresses of everybody in a police register, which are believed to be classified.
- Names, photos, and residential addresses of all operators in the military's most secret units that are equivalent to the SAS or SEAL teams.
- Names, photos, and addresses of everybody having protected identity for some reasons, such as witness relocation or murder threats.
- Type, model, weight, and any defects in all government and military vehicles, including their operator, which reveals a much about the structure of military support units.
